This is a list of Halloween television specials and Halloween-themed television episodes.

Children and family
 ABC Weekend Special: 
 "Soup and Me" (1978)
 Ace Ventura: Pet Detective: Witch's Brew (1999)
 The Addams Family
 "Puttergeist" (1992)
 Alma's Way:
 Alma's Movie Night (2021)
 Trick or Treatasaurus (2022)
 The Haunted Hallway (2022)
 The Alvin Show:
 "Haunted House" (1962)
 Alvin and the Chipmunks:
 "The Mystery of Seville Manor" (1987)
 "Babysitter Fright Night" (1988)
 Alvinnn!!! and the Chipmunks
 "Switch Witch" (2009)
 Angry Birds Stella
 "Night of the Bling" (2015)
 Angry Birds: Summer Madness:
 "Hollow-Weenie" (2022)
 Angry Birds Toons:
 "Night of the Living Pork" (2013)
 "Sweets of Doom" (2014)
 "Porcula" (2015)
Angela Anaconda
 "Boo Who" / The Haunting of Angela Anaconda (2000)
 Archie's Weird Mysteries
 "Halloween of Horror" (2000)
 Arthur: 
 "The Fright Stuff" (1999)
 "Hic or Treat" (2007)
 "Arthur and the Haunted Treehouse" (2017)
 Bananas in Pyjamas
 "The Trickisaurus" (2011)
 "Halloween" (2012)
 Barney & Friends:
 Barney's Halloween Party (1998) 
 Guess Who? / Sweet Treats (2007)
 The Batman (Season 2, Episode 11): Grundy's Night (2005)
 Beetlejuice: 
 "Laugh of the Party" (1989)
 "Bewitched, Bothered & Beetlejuiced" (1990)
 The Berenstain Bears
 "Too Much TV/Trick-or-Treat" (2003)
 Best Foot Forward
 "Halloween" (2022)
 The Biskitts
 "Moving Day" / A Biskitt Halloween (1983)
 Biz Kid$
 "A Biz Kid$ Halloween Special" (2008, filmed in 2007)
 "A Biz Kid$ Halloween Special 2" (2009, filmed in 2008)
 "A Biz Kid$ Halloween Special 3" (2010)
 "A Biz Kid$ Halloween Special 4" (2011)
 "A Biz Kid$ Halloween Special 5" (2012)
 "A Biz Kid$ Halloween Special: The Final Chapter" (2017)
 Bobby's World (Season 1, Episode 8): Night of the Living Pumpkin (1990)
 The Boss Baby: Back in Business
 "Halloween" (2020)
 Boy Girl Dog Cat Mouse Cheese
 "Greb-Nefual E-Neg!" (2019)
 The Busy World of Richard Scarry
 "The First Halloween Ever" (1997)
 Caillou
 "Caillou Loves Halloween" (1999)
 "Fall Is in the Air" (2000)
 "Caillou's Halloween Costume" (2006)
 Calimero
 "Scared Stiff" (2013)
 Casper's Halloween Special (1979)
 The Cat in the Hat Knows a Lot About That: 
 "Aye Aye" (2011)
 "Trick or Treat" (2011)
 "The Cat in the Hat Knows a Lot About Halloween!" (2016)
 The Chica Show
 "A Halloween Adventure" (2014)
 Class of the Titans
 "See You at the Crossroads" (2006)
 Claymation Comedy of Horrors (1991)
 Clifford's Puppy Days
 "Clifford the Scary Puppy/Things That Go Bump", The Halloween Bandit  (2005)
 Clifford the Big Red Dog
 "Boo!" (2000)
 Clifford the Big Red Dog (2019)
 "The Halloween Costume Crisis/Clifford's Howl-o-ween!" (2021)
 Curious George
 "A Halloween Boo-Fest" (2013)
 "Tale of the Frightening Flapjacks/Happy Yelloween" (2022)
 Cyberchase: 
 "Castleblanca" (2002)
Trick or Treat (2003)
The Halloween Howl (2006)
Watts of Halloween Trouble (2017)
 D-TV
 "Monster Hits" (1987)
 Les Dalton
 "Funny Fangs Dalton" (2015)
 Davey and Goliath
 "Halloween Who-Dun-It" (1967)
 The David S. Pumpkins Halloween Special (2017)
 Dinosaurs: 
When Food Goes Bad (1991)
Little Boy Boo (1992)
 Dinosaur Train: 
Night Train / Fossil Fred (2009)
Haunted Roundhouse / Big Pond Pumpkin Patch (2011)
 Donkey Hodie:
 A Donkey Hodie Halloween (2022)
 DragonflyTV
 "DragonflyTV’s First Annual Halloween Special" (2002)
 "DragonflyTV’s Second Annual Halloween Special" (2003)
 "DragonflyTV’s Third Annual Halloween Special" (2004)
 "DragonflyTV’s Fourth Annual Halloween Special" (2005)
 "DragonflyTV’s Fifth Annual Halloween Special" (2006)
 "A DragonflyTV Halloween of Science" (2007)
 "DragonflyTV’s Last Halloween" (2008)
 The Dog Who Saved Halloween (2011)
 The Doozers
 "Spookypalooza" (2014)
 Dot.
 "Scaremaster 2.0" / Ghoul Away (2016)
 Dragon
 "Dragon's Fall Collection" / Dragon's Halloween (2006)
 Duck & Goose
 "Go Trick or Treating" (2022)
 Eek! The Cat
 "HallowEek" (1992)
 Ella the Elephant
 "Ella's Special Delivery" / Frankie's Perfect Pumpkin (2014)
 Elinor Wonders Why
 "Butterfly Party" / More Than One Right Way (2022)
 Eloise: The Animated Series
 "Eloise's Rawther Unusual Halloween" (2006)
 Extreme Dinosaurs
 "Night of the Living Pumpkins" (1997)
 The Fat Albert Halloween Special (1977)
 Festival of Family Classics
 "Jack O' Lantern" (1972)
 Fetch! with Ruff Ruffman
 "Ruffman Manor Is Haunted" (2010)
 The Flintstones: 
 "A Haunted House is Not a Home" (1964)
 "The Gruesomes" (1964)
 The Flintstone Kids: 
 "Curse of the Gemstone Diamond" (1986)
 "Freddy the 13th" (1988)
 The Flintstones Meet Rockula and Frankenstone (1979)
 Floogals
 "Project Halloween" (2016)
 For Better or for Worse
 "The Good-for-Nothing" (1993)
 For Real
 "Halloween" (2020)
 Fred 2: Night of the Living Fred (2011)
 The Friendly Giant
 "Halloween Concert" (1979)
 Gabby's Dollhouse
 "Happy CAT-O-Ween!" (2022)
 Gadget and the Gadgetinis
 "Trick or Trap" (2001)
 The Garfield Show
 "Orange and Black" (2009)
 Garfield's Halloween Adventure (1985)
 Gary Larson's Tales from the Far Side (1994)
 Get Ace
 "Halloween Hijinks"/Dawn of the Dumb (2014)
 The Great Bear Scare (1983)
 Halloween Is Grinch Night (1977)
 The Halloween That Almost Wasn't (1979)
 The Halloween Tree (1993)
 Hello, Jack! The Kindness Show:
 "Jack’s Hallowonderful" (2022)
 HappinessCharge PreCure!
 "The Big Bang Destroyed! Unexpected Formidable Appears!" (2014)
 The Haunting of Barney Palmer (1987)
Harvey Girls Forever!:
 "Harveyween" (2018)
 "Scare Bud" (2020)
 "All Harveys Eve" (2020)
 The Healing Powers of Dude: "House Party of Horrors" (2020)
 Helpsters
 "Helpsters Halloween / Storyteller Sophia" (2020)
 Home: Adventures with Tip & Oh
 "Kung Boov" / The Werewolves of Chicago (2016)
 Hugtto! PreCure
 "Charged with Happiness! Happy Halloween!" (2018)
 If You Give a Mouse a Cookie
 "If You Give a Mouse a Pumpkin" (2019)
 Interrupting Chicken
 "Dr. Chickenstein" / "The Sorcerer’s Thesaurus" (2022)
 It's the Great Pumpkin, Charlie Brown (1966)
 Jackie Chan Adventures:
 "Chi of the Vampire" (2002)
 "Fright Fight Night" (2003)
 Jacob Two-Two
 "Jacob Two-Two and the Halloween Hullabaloo" (2005)
 Jelly Jamm:
 "The Monster of Boredom" (2013)
 Jellystone!: 
"Spell Book" (2021)
 Jem
 "Trick or Techrat" (1987)
 The Jetsons (Season 2, Episode 26): Haunted Halloween (1985)
 Justin Time
 "Cleopatra's Cat" (2011)
 "The Count's Creepy Critters" (2016)
 Just Add Magic: "Just Add Halloween" (2016)
 Kate & Mim-Mim
 "Lil' Boo" (2016)
 Lassie:
 "The Witch" (1955)
 Haunted House (1957)
 "The UNICEF Story" (1959)
 The Last Halloween (1991)
 Life with Louie (Season 3, Episode 6): Louie's Harrowing Halloween (1997)
 Little Charmers
 "Spooky Pumpkin Moon Night" (2015)
 Little Ellen: "Happy Elloween" (2021)
 Little Lunch
 "The Halloween Horror Story" (2016)
 The Little Rascals
 "Fright Night" (1982)
 The Littles: 
 "The Big Scare" (1983)
 "The Littles' Halloween" (1984)
 The Little Lulu Show:
 "The Bogeyman" (1996)
 "The Little Girl Who Never Heard of Ghosts" (1998)
 Llama Llama: "Llama Llama Trick or Treat" (2018)
 Madagascar: A Little Wild
 "A Fang-tastic Halloween" (2020)
 Mad Mad Mad Monsters (1972)
 Madeline: 
 "Madeline and the Costume Party" (1993)
 "Madeline and the Haunted Castle" (1995)
 "Madeline's Halloween & Madeline and the Spider Lady" (2000)
 * Marvin the Tap-Dancing Horse: 
 "Elizabeth and the Haunted House/Marvin Horses Around "
 The Magic School Bus:
 "Magic School Bus in the Haunted House" (1994)
 "Magic School Bus Going Batty " (1995)
 Martin Mystery: 
 "Haunting of the Blackwater" (2004)
 "The Vampire Returns" (2004)
 "Curse of the Necklace" (2004)
 Maho Girls PreCure!: 
 "Sweet? or Not Sweet? The Magical Pumpkin Festival!" (2016)
 "Today is Halloween! Everyone, By Smile!" (2016)
 The Mask (Season 1, Episode 13): All Hallow's Eve (1995)
 Men in Black: The Series (Season 2, Episode 19): The Jack O' Lantern Syndrome (1998)
 Mighty Morphin Power Rangers: 
 Season 1, Episode 25: Life's a Masquerade (1993)
 Season 1, Episode 54: Trick or Treat (1994)
 Season 2, Episode 21: Zedd's Monster Mash (1994)
 Miss BG
 "Party Contest; Alien Nightmares" (2005)
 Monster Buster Club
 "Trick or Treat...or Alien?" (2008)
 Monster High: Ghouls Rule! (2012)
 Monster Mash (2000)
 The Mouse Factory
 "Spooks and Magic" (1972)
The Dark (2008)
The Mr. Peabody & Sherman Show:  Spooktacular/Nicolas-Joseph Cugnot (2016)
 The Muppet Show: 
 "Vincent Price" (1976)
 "Alice Cooper" (1978)
 "Alan Arkin" (1980)
 Nature Cat
 "Runaway Pumpkin" (2016)
 Ned's Newt
 "Home Alone with Frank" (1997)
 The New Adventures of Madeline
 "Madeline and the Haunted Castle" (1995)
 The New Lassie
 "Halloween" (1989)
 The New Misadventures of Ichabod Crane (1979)
 The New Worst Witch
 "Trick or Treat" (2005)
 The Night of the Headless Horseman (1999)
 Oggy and the Cockroaches
 "The Ghost-Hunter" (1998)
 "Scaredy Cat" (2013)
 Pac-Man Halloween Special (1982)
 Pajanimals
 "Spooky Costumes" (2012)
 PaRappa the Rapper (TV series)
 "Are You Perhaps Scared?" (2001)
 Pat the Dog
 "Trick or Treat Terror" (2017)
 Pearlie
 "Hideous Halloween" (2009)
 Peg + Cat
 "The Parade Problem" / The Halloween Problem (2013)
 Piggy Tales:
 "Scared Sick" (2016)
 "Shadow Pig" (2016)
 "Pumpkin Head" (2016)
 "Scary Fog" (2017)
 "Ghost Hog" (2017)
 Pinkalicious & Peterrific
 "Pink or Treat"/Scary Berry (2018)
 "Pink Or Wizard" (2021)
 Pinky Dinky Doo
 "Tyler Dinky Doo's Big Boo"
 Pixel Pinkie:
 "Dare To Be Scared" (2009)
 "Trick or Treat" (2009)
 "Double Trouble" (2012)
 Pocoyo:
 "Halloween Tales" (2018)
 Pokémon:
 "The Tower of Terror" (1997)
 "A Festival Trade! A Festival Farewell?" (2015)
 "A Haunted House for Everyone" (2018)
 Pucca
 "Trick or Treat" (2019) 
 A Pumpkin Full of Nonsense (1985)
 Raggedy Ann and Andy in The Pumpkin Who Couldn't Smile (1979)
 The Real Ghostbusters: 
 Season 1, Episode 8: When Halloween Was Forever (1986)
 Season 3, Episode 7: Halloween II 1/2 (1987)
 Season 5, Episode 12: The Halloween Door (1989)
 Season 6, Episode 10: Deja Boo (1990)
 Ready Jet Go: 
 "Jet's First Halloween" (2016)
 "That's One Gigantic Pumpkin, Jet Propulsion!" (2018)
 ReBoot
 "To Mend and Defend" (1998)
 Rolie Polie Olie
 "The Legend of Spookie Ookie / Oooh, Scary / Zowie, Queen of the Pumpkins" (1999)
 Rude Dog and the Dweebs
 "Nightmare on Dweeb Street" (1989)
 Sabrina: The Animated Series
 "Nothin' Says Lovin' Like Something from a Coven" (1999)
 The Save-Ums!:
 "Monkey Up a Tree!/It's Halloween!" (2003)
 Scared Shrekless (2010)
 Scary Godmother: Halloween Spooktakular (2003)
 Scary Godmother: The Revenge of Jimmy (2005)
 Schoolhouse Rock!
 "Them Not-So-Dry Bones" (1979)
 Sesame Street: 
 "Episode 0657: Scary Street" (1974)
 "Episode 4635: Halloween" (This episode was replaced by Snazzy Society in Australia) (2016)
 Sharkdog
 "Sharkdog's Fintastic Halloween" (2021)
 Sharky's Friends: Spooky Special (2008)
 SheZow
 Vampire Cats In Zombie Town (2013)
 Shining Time Station: 
 "Scare Dares" (1991)
 Sid the Science Kid
 "Halloween Spooky Science Special" (2011)
 Skinner Boys: Guardians of the Lost Secrets
 "Dragon's Breath" (2015)
 The Smurfs
 "All Hallows Eve" / The Littlest Witch (1983)
 The Smurfs: The Legend of Smurfy Hollow (2013)
The Snoopy Show: The Curse of a Fuzzy Face (2021)
 Snorks (Season 3, Episode 2): A Willie Scary Shalloween (1987)
 Space Racers
 "Haunted Asteroid" (2016)
 Space Goofs
 "Spook to Rent" (1998)
 "Count Gracula" (1998)
 The Spectacular Spider-Man
 "The Uncertainty Principle" (2008)
 Spirit Riding Free
 "Lucky and the Ghostly Gotcha!" (2018)
 Spookley the Square Pumpkin (2004)
 Spooky Bats and Scaredy Cats (2009)
 Stella and Sam
 "Felix the Ghost" / Monster Misunderstanding (2013)
 The Strange Chores
 "Witch Watch" (2019)
 "Stop the Monster Slime" (2019)
 "Don't Trick or Tweet" (2019)
 Stickin' Around
 "The Ghost and Mr. Coffin" (1998)
 Stillwater
 "Ghost Story" (2021)
 Suite PreCure
 "WakuWaku! Everyone Transform for Halloween Nya!" (2011)
 The Super Mario Bros. Super Show!
 "Count Koopula" (1989)
 "Koopenstein" (1989)
 Super Why!
 "The Ghost Who Was Afraid of Halloween" (2008)
 Teddy Bear Scare (1998)
 Talking Tom & Friends
 "App-y Halloween!" (2015)
 "Double Date Disaster" (2017)
 "Corn Heads" (2018)
 "Hank vs. Vampires" (2018)
 "The Secret Life of Ms. Vanthrax" (2019)
 "My Sweet Halloween" (2020)
 Teenage Mutant Ninja Turtles
 "Super Irma" (1992)
 Teenage Mutant Ninja Turtles
 "All Hallows Thieves" (2005)
 Theodore Tugboat: 
 "George's Ghost" (1994)
 "Theodore and the Haunted Tugboat" (1998)
 This is Daniel Cook
 "Trick-or-Treating" (2005)
 The Tom and Jerry Comedy Show 
 "Farewell, Sweet Mouse" (1980)
 Tom & Jerry Halloween Special (1987)
 Under the Umbrella Tree
 "Halloween Under the Umbrella Tree" (1991)
 Where's Waldo? (2019 TV series): "A Welsh Trick or Treat" (2020)
 Where on Earth Is Carmen Sandiego?
 "Trick or Treat?" (1996)
 Wild Kratts:
 "A Bat in the Brownies" / Masked Bandits (2011)
 "Secrets of a Spider's Web" (2012)
 "Creeping Creatures" (2018)
 Wingin' It
 "Fright Club" (2011)
 Wishbone
 "Frankenbone" (1995)
 "Halloween Hound: The Legend of Creepy Collars: Part 1" (1997)
 "Halloween Hound: The Legend of Creepy Collars: Part 2" (1997)
 W.I.T.C.H.
 "W is for Witch" (2006)
 The Witch Who Turned Pink (1989)
 Witch's Night Out (1978)
 The Woody Woodpecker Show
 "Spook-a-Nanny" (1964)
 WordGirl
 "Tobey's Trick and Treats" (2009)
 WordWorld
 "A Kooky Spooky Halloween" / Sheep's Halloween Costume (2008)
 The Worst Witch (1986)
 The Worst Witch
 "A Mean Halloween" (1998)
 X-Men: The Animated Series
 "Bloodlines" (1996)
 Yabba-Dabba Dinosaurs
 "Dawn of the Disposals" (2021)
 Zou
 "A Halloween Hunt" (2013)

Cartoon Network/Boomerang/Discovery Family
 6teen: 
 "Boo, Dude!" (Season 1, Episode 26) (2005)
 "Dude of the Living Dead" (Season 1, Episode 27) (2005)
 Almost Naked Animals:
 "Howieween/Hotel of Horrors" (Season 1, Episode 24) (2011)
 The Amazing World of Gumball: 
 "Halloween" (Season 2, Episode 9) (2012)
 "The Mirror" (Season 3, Episode  23) (2014)
 "The Scam" (Season 4, Episode 39) (2016)
 "The Ghouls" (Season 6, Episode 25) (2018)
 "The Gumball Chronicles: The Curse of Elmore" (Season 1, Episode 1) (2020)
 Apple & Onion:
 "The Eater" (Season 2, Episode 5) (2020)
 "Eyesore At Sunset" (Season 2, Episode 25) (2021)
 Atomic Betty:
 "When Worlds Collide/The Ghost Ship of Aberdeffia" (Season 1, Episode 9) (2004)
 Ben 10: 
  "Ghostfreaked Out" (Season 2, Episode 11) (2006)
  "The Return" (Season 3, Episode 11) (2007)
  "Be Afraid of the Dark" (Season 3, Episode 12) (2007)
 Ben 10: Alien Force:
  "Ghost Town" (Season 3, Episode 10) (2009)
 Ben 10: Omniverse: 
 "Rad Monster Party" (Season 5, Episode 6) (2014)
 "Charmed, I'm Sure" (Season 5, Episode 7) (2014)
 "The Vampire Strikes Back" (Season 5, Episode 8) (2014) 
 Ben 10:
  "Scared Silly" (Season 1, Episode 35) (2017)
  "Beware of the Scare-Crow" (Season 3, Episode 37) (2019)
 Camp Lazlo:
 "Hallobeanies" (Season 2, Episode 1) (2005)
 Casper's Scare School:
 "Boo!" (Season 1, Episode 7B) (2009)
 Chowder: 
 "The Spookiest House in Marzipan/The Poultry Geist" (Season 3, Episode 42A) (2009)
 Clarence: 
 "Belson's Sleepover" (Season 1, Episode 22)" (2014)
 "Spooky Boo!" (Season 1, Episode 51) (2015)
 "A Nightmare on Aberdale Street: Balance's Revenge" (Season 3, Episode 26) (2017)
 Codename: Kids Next Door: 
 "Operation: G.H.O.S.T." (Season 2, Episode 20) (2003)
 "Operation: T.R.I.C.K.Y." (Season 3, Episode 37) (2004)
 Cow and Chicken:
 "Halloween with Dead Ghost, Coast to Coast" (Season 2, Episode 15B) (1998)
 Craig of the Creek: 
 "The Haunted Dollhouse" (Season 2, Episode 18) (2019)
 "Trick or Creek" (Season 3, Episode 11-12) (2020)
 "Legend of the Library" (Season 4, Episode 1) (2021)
 Dan Vs.:
 The Wolf-Man" (Season 1, Episode 2) (2011)
 DC Super Hero Girls: 
 #SoulSisters" (Season 1, Episode 24-25) (2019)
 "#SchoolGhoul" (Season 1, Episode 49) (2020)
 "#NightmareInGotham" (Season 2, Episode 25-26) (2021)
 Dexter's Laboratory: 
 "Monstory" (Season 1, Episode 13c) (1997)
 "Filet of Soul" (Season 2, Episode 8a) (1997)
 "Scare Tactics" (Season 3, Episode 65a) (2002)
 Ed, Edd n Eddy:
 Ed, Edd n Eddy's Boo Haw Haw (2005)
 Foster's Home for Imaginary Friends:
 "Nightmare on Wilson Way" (Season 5, Episode 10) (2007)
 The Grim Adventures of Billy & Mandy:
 "Grim or Gregory?" (Season 1, Episode 8A) (2002)
 Billy & Mandy's Jacked-Up Halloween" (Season 1, Episode 12-13) (2003)
 Underfist: Halloween Bash (2008)
 Grojband:
 "Dance of the Dead" (Season 1, Episode 3) (2013)
 I Am Weasel: 
 "I Am Vampire" (Season 3, Episode 7) (1998)
 "I Are Ghost" (Season 4, Episode 5) (1999)
 I Am Franken-Weasel" (Season 5, Episode 22) (1999)
 Johnny Bravo: 
 "Bravo Dooby Doo" (Season 1, Episode 3B) (1997) 
 "A Wolf in Chick's Clothing" (Season 1, Episode 9B)) (1997)
 "Going Batty" (Season 1, Episode 11A) (1997) 
 "Frankenbravo" (Season 3, Episode 12C) (2001)
 Johnny Test:
 "Johnny Trick or Treat/Nightmare on Johnny's Street" (Season 5, Episode 13) (2011)
 The Johnny Who Saved Halloween/Johnny's Zombie Bomb" (Season 6, Episode 13) (2013)
 Justice League:
 "A Knight of Shadows, Parts 1 & 2" (Season 1, Episode 20-21) (2002)
 Justice League Action:
 "Trick or Threat" (Season 1, Episode 13) (2017)
 The Life and Times of Juniper Lee:
 "It's the Great Pumpkin, Juniper Lee" (Season 2, Episode 1) (2005)
 Littlest Pet Shop (2012):
 Littlest Pet Shop of Horrors" (Season 4, Episode 5) (2015)
 MAD: 
 "Kitchen Nightmares Before Christmas/How I Met Your Mummy" (Season 2, Episode 9) (2011)
 "Frankenwinnie/ParaMorgan" (Season 3, Episode 15) (2012)
 "Doraline/Monster Mashville" (Season 4, Episode 21) (2013)
 Mao Mao: Heroes of Pure Heart:
 "Fright Wig" (Season 1, Episode 29) (2019)
 Mighty Magiswords:
 "Flirty Phantom" (Season 1, Episode 7) (2016)
 The Mr. Men Show:
 "Full Moon/Night" (Season 1, Episode 16) (2008)
 My Gym Partner's a Monkey:
 "It's the Creppy Custodian, Adam Lyon" (Season 1, Episode 15) (2006)
 My Little Pony: Friendship Is Magic:
 "Luna Eclipsed" (Season 2, Episode 4) (2011)
 "Scare Master" (Season 5, Episode 21) (2015)
 Ninjago (TV series):
 Ninjago: Day of the Departed (2016)
 OK K.O.! Let's Be Heroes:
 "We Got Hacked" (Season 1, Episode 18) (2017)
 "Parents Day" (Season 1, Episode 36) (2017)
 "Monster Party" (Season 2, Episode 27) (2018)
 Out of Jimmy's Head:
 Ghosts" (Season 1, Episode 6)  (2007)
 Over the Garden Wall (2014)
 Pound Puppies (2010):
 "Nightmare on Pound Street" (Season 1, Episode 2) (2010)
 Power Players:
 "All Trick no Treat" (Season 1, Episode 9) (2019)
 "Gathering Dark" (Season 2, Episode 11) (2019)
 R.L. Stine's The Haunting Hour:
 "Pumpkinhead" (Season 2, Episode 5) (2011)
 "I'm Not Martin" (Season 4, Episode 1) (2014)
 "Return of the Pumpkinheads" (Season 4, Episode 5) (2014)
 Robotboy:
 "Halloween" (Season 1, Episode 5B) (2005)
 Samurai Jack:
 "Jack and the Zombies" (Season 3, Episode 4) (2002)
 Scaredy Squirrel:
 "Halloweekend" (Season 1, Episode 15B) (2011)
 Sidekick:
 "Halloweenie" (Season 1, Episode 11B) (2010)
 Steven Universe:
 "Horror Club" (Season 1, Episode 41) (2015)
 Stoked:
 "Penthouse of Horror" (Season 1, Episode 16) (2009)
 Summer Camp Island:
 "Ghost the Boy" (Season 1, Episode 8) (2018)
 "Mop Forever" (Season 1, Episode 30) (2019)
 Teen Titans:
 "Haunted (2004)
 The Tom and Jerry Show:
 "Costume Party Smarty" (Season 3, Episode 26) (2019)
 Totally Spies!:
 "Stuck in the Middle Ages with You" (Season 1, Episode 4) (2001)
 "Halloween is, Like, So Pagan" (Season 3, Episode 20) (2005)
 Transformers: Animated:
 "Along Came a Spider" (Season 1, Episode 9) (2008)
 Transformers: Rescue Bots:
 "Ghost in the Machine" (Season 4, Episode 7) (2016)
 Tutenstein:
 "Day on the Undead" (Season 2, Episode 13) (2004)
 Uncle Grandpa: 
 "Afraid of the Dark" (Season 1, Episode 11) (2013)
 "Haunted RV" (Season 2, Episode 10) (2014)
 "Fool Moon" (Season 2, Episode 23) (2015)
 "Costume Crisis" (Season 4, Episode 6) (2016)
  Unikitty!:
 "Spoooooky Game" (Season 1, Episode 1) (2017)
 "Scary Tales" (Season 1, Episode 36) (2018)
 "Scary Tales 2" (Season 2, Episode 40) (2019)
  Victor and Valentino:
 "El Silbon" (Season 1, Episode 38) (2019)
 "Ghosted" (Season 2, Episode 28) (2020)
 "PuzzleMaster" (Season 3, Episode 10-11) (2021)
 We Baby Bears:
 "Witches" (Season 1, Episode 30) (2022)
 We Bare Bears: 
 "Charlie's Halloween Thing" (Season 3, Episode 29) (2017)
 "Charlie's Halloween Thing 2" (Season 4, Episode 9) (2018)
 Young Justice:
 "Secrets" (Season 1, Episode 18) (2011)

Adventure Time 
 "Slumber Party Panic" (Season 1, Episode 1) (2010)
 "The Creeps" (Season 3, episode 12) (2011)
 "From Bad to Worse" (Season 3, episode 13) (2011)
 "No One Can Hear You" (Season 3, Episode 15) (2011)
 "Ghost Fly" (Season 6, episode 17) (2014)
 "Blank-Eyed Girl" (Season 7, episode 19) (2016)

Courage the Cowardly Dog 
 "Courage Meets Bigfoot" (Season 1, Episode 3A) (1999)
 "The Demon in the Mattress" (Season 1, Episode 4A) (1999)
 "Night of the Weremole" (Season 1, Episode 5A) (1999)
 "Shirley the Medium" (Season 1, Episode 6B) (2000) 
 "King Ramses' Curse" (Season 1, Episode 7A) (2000) 
 "Courage Meets the Mummy" (Season 2, Episode 4A) (2001)

The Powerpuff Girls 
 "Boogie Frights/Abracadaver" (Season 1, Episode 5) (1998)
 "The Squashening" (Season 1, Episode 33) (2016)
 "Midnight at the Mayor's Mansion" (Season 2, Episode 28) (2017)
 "Witch's Crew" (Season 3, Episode 21) (2018)

Regular Show 
 "Terror Tales of the Park" (Season 3, Episode 4) (2011)
 "Terror Tales of the Park II" (Season 4, Episode 3) (2012)
 "Terror Tales of the Park III" (Season 5, Episode 8) (2013)
 "Terror Tales of the Park IV" (Season 6, Episode 4) (2014)
 "Terror Tales of the Park V" (Season 7, Episode 9) (2015)
 "Terror Tales of the Park VI" (Season 8, Episode 19) (2016)

Teen Titans Go! 
 "Halloween" (Season 2, Episode 19) (2014)
 "Scary Figure Dance" (Season 3, Episode 13) (2015)
 "Halloween v Christmas" (Season 4, Episode 2) (2016)
 Costume Contest" (Season 4, Episode 38) (2017)
 "Monster Squad!" (Season 5, Episode 8) (2018)
 "Witches Brew" (Season 5, Episode 50) (2019)
 "Ghost with the Most" (Season 6, Episode 20) (2020)
 Pepo the Pumpkinman" (Season 7, Episode 22) (2021)
 Welcome to Halloween" (Season 8, Episode 1) (2022)

Total Drama 
 Total Drama Island:
 "Hook, Line & Screamer" (Season 1, Episode 19) (2007)
 Total Drama Action:
 "The Sand Witch Project" (Season 2, Episode 9) (2009)
 Total Drama World Tour:
 "I See London..." (Season 3, Episode 13) (2010)
 Total Drama: Revenge of the Island:
 "Finders Creepers" (Season 4, Episode 4) (2012)
 Total Drama: All-Stars:
 "Moon Madness" (Season 5, Episode 5) (2013/2014)
 Total Drama: Pahkitew Island:
 "Hurl & Go Seek" (Season 5, Episode 22) (2014)
 Total Drama Presents: The Ridonculous Race:
 "A Tisket, a Casket, I'm Gonna Blow a Gasket" (Season 1, Episode 7) (2015)
 Total DramaRama:
 "That's a Wrap" (Season 1, Episode 13) (2018)
 "Ghoul Spirit" (Season 2, Episode 25) (2020)
 "Duncan Carving" (Season 2, Episode 26) (2020)
 "Gwen Scary, Gwen Lost" (Season 3, Episode 29) (2021)

Disney
 The 7D
 "Buckets" / '"Frankengloom" (Season 1, Episode 14) (2014)
 American Dragon: Jake Long
 "Halloween Bash" (Season 1, Episode 17) (2005)
 Amphibia
 "The Shut-In" (Season 2, Episode 11) (2020)
 A.N.T. Farm: 
 "mutANT farm" (Season 1, Episode 14) (2011)
 "mutANT farm 2" (Season 2, Episode 13) (2012)
 "mutANT farm 3" (Season 3, Episode 11) (2013)
 Austin & Ally: 
 "Costumes & Courage" (Season 2, Episode 1) (2012)
 "Horror Stories & Halloween Scares" (Season 3, Episode 20) (2014)
 "Scary Spirits & Spooky Stories" (Season 4, Episode 15) (2015)
 Avengers Assemble: 
 "Into the Dark Dimension" (Season 3, Episode 7) (2016)
 "Why I Hate Halloween" (Season 4, Episode 8) (2017)
 Bear in the Big Blue House
 "Halloween Bear" (Season 3, Episode 5) (1999)
 Best Friends Whenever: 
 "Cyd and Shelby's Haunted Escape" (Season 1, Episode 9) (2015)
 "Night of the Were-Diesel" (Season 2, Episode 6) (2016)
 Big City Greens: 
 "Blood Moon" (Season 1, Episode 19) (2018)
 "Squashed" (Season 3, Episode 1) (2021)
 "Pizza Deliverance" (Season 3, Episode 15A) (2022)
 Big Hero 6: The Series:
 "Obake Yashiki" (Season 1, Episode 21) (2018)
 Bizaardvark:
 "Halloweenvark" (Season 2, Episode 12) (2016)
 "Halloweenvark: Part Boo!" (Season 2, Episode 13) (2017)
 "Halloweenvark Part 3: Mali-Boo" (Season 3, Episode 7) (2018)
 Brandy & Mr. Whiskers
 "The Curse of the Vampire Bat" / "The Monkey's Paw" (Season 1, Episode 11) (2004)
 Bride of Boogedy (1987)
Bunk'd: 
"Camp Kiki-Slasher" (Season 2, Episode 7) (2016)
"Fog'd In" (Season 2, Episode 10) (2016)
"In Your Wildest Dreams" (Season 4, Episode 7) (2019)
"Bunkhouse of Horror" (Season 6, Episode 9) (2022)
 The Buzz on Maggie
 "The Big Score" / "Scare Wars" (Season 1, Episode 12) (2005) 
 Cars on the Road:
 "Lights Out" (Season 1, Episode 2) (2022)
 Chibiverse:
 "The Great Chibi Mix-Up!" (Season 1, Episode 3) (2022)
 The Chicken Squad
 "T-Wrecks" / "Trick or Eek" (Season 1, Episode 16) (2021)
 Combo Niños:
 "Night of the Zotz" (Season 1, Episode 19) (2008)
 Crash & Bernstein: 
 "Scaredy Crash" (Season 1, Episode 2) (2012)
 "Health-o-ween" (Season 2, Episode 2) (2013)
 D-TV: Monster Hits (1987)
 Dave the Barbarian
 "That Darn Ghost!" / "The Cow Says Moon" (Season 1, Episode 18) (2004)
 Disney Fam Jam
 "Trick or Treat Yo Self" (Season 1, Episode 12) (2020)
 Disney's Greatest Villains (1977)
 A Disney Halloween Hosted by Snow White's Magic Mirror (1981)
 Disney's Halloween Treat (1982) 
 Disney's House of Mouse
 Halloween with Hades (Season 3, Episode 23)
 "House Ghosts" (Season 3, Episode 24) (2003)
"Disney's Magic Bake-Off: Zombies" (2021)
 Disney Sing-Along Songs
 "Happy Haunting - Party at Disneyland!" (1998)
 Doc McStuffins: 
 "Boo-Hoo to You!" (Season 1, Episode 23A) (2012)
 "Hallie Halloween" (Season 3, Episode 13A) (2015)
 Dog with a Blog: 
 "Howloween" (Season 2, Episode 3) (2013)
 "Howloween 2: The Final Reckoning" (Season 3, Episode 2) (2014)
 Don't Look Under The Bed (1999)
 Doug:
 "Doug's Halloween Adventure" (Season 4, Episode 4) (1993) 
 "Doug's Bloody Buddy" (Season 5, Episode 8) (1996)
 "Night of the Living Dougs" (Season 7, Episode 6) (1998)
 Doraemon: Gadget Cat from the Future: 
 "Noby's Turn at Bat"/"The House of Forced Fitness" (Season 1, Episode 20) (2014)
 "Werewolf Cream"/"Monsters In the House" (Season 1, Episode 21) (2014)
DuckTales:
 "The Trickening!" (Season 3, Episode 10) (2020)
 The Emperor's New School
 "The Yzma That Stole Kuzcoween" / "Monster Masquerade" (Season 1, Episode 20) (2006)
 Eureka!:
 "Eurek-Or-Treat" (Season 1, Episode 14A) (2022)
 Even Stevens
 "A Very Scary Story" (Season 2, Episode 13) (2001)
Fancy Nancy:
 Nancy's Costume Clash / Nancy's Ghostly Halloween (Season 1, Episode 11) (2018)
 Firebuds: 
 "The Not-So Haunted House" / "Halloween Heroes" (Season 1, Episode 9) (2022)
 Fish Hooks: 
 "Parasite Fright" (Season 1, Episode 27)  (2011)
 "Halloween Haul" (Season 1, Episode 40) (2011)
 "Unfinished Doll Business" (Season 2, Episode 26) (2012)
 "Chicks Dig Vampires" (Season 2, Episode 31) (2012)
 Frankenweenie (1984)
 Future-Worm!
 "Robo-Carp-Alypse" / The Reemen / Dr. D, Ghost Hunter (2016)
 Gabby Duran & the Unsittables: Beware the Fright Master! (2021)
 Gamer's Guide to Pretty Much Everything:
 "The Psycho Zombie Bloodbath" (2015)
 "The Ghost" (2016)
 The Ghost and Molly McGee:
 "Scaring is Caring" (2022)
 Girl Meets World: 
 "Girl Meets World of Terror" (2014)
 "Girl Meets World of Terror 2" (2015)
 "Girl Meets World of Terror 3" (2016)
 Girl vs. Monster (2012)
 Go Away, Unicorn!:
 Trick or Treat, Unicorn (2018)
 Go Away, Frankencorn (2018)
Goldie & Bear:  Witch Cat is Which?/ Trick or Treat Trouble (2018) 
 Good Luck Charlie: 
Scary Had a Little Lamb (2011)
Le Halloween (2012)
 Fright Knight (2013)
 Goof Troop:
 "Hallow-Weenies" (1992)
 Gravity Falls: 
 "Summerween" (2012)
 "Little Gift Shop of Horrors" (2014)
 Halloween Hall o' Fame (1977) 
 Halloweentown (1998)
 Halloweentown II: Kalabar's Revenge (2001)
 Halloweentown High (2004)
 Hamster & Gretel: 
 "The Nightmarionette" (2022)
 "U-F-Uh-Oh" (2022)
 Handy Manny
 "Halloween", Haunted Clock Tower, A Job from Outer Space, Sounds Like Halloween, Mrs. Lopart's Attic (2007-2013)
 Hannah Montana
 "Torn Between Two Hannahs" (2006)
 Henry Hugglemonster: 
 "The Halloween Scramble" (2013)
 "Huggleween Moon" (2015)
 Higglytown Heroes
 "Higgly Halloween" aka Halloween Heroes (2004)
Hotel Transylvania: The Series: 
 "The Legend of Pumpkin Guts" (2017)
 "Welcome to Human Park" (2018)
House of Mouse:
Mickey's House of Villains (2002)
Halloween with Hades (2003)
House Ghosts (2003)
 Hulk and the Agents of S.M.A.S.H.
 "Hulking Commandos" (2014)
 I Didn't Do It: 
 "Next of Pumpkin" (2014)
 "Bite Club" (2015)
 I'm in the Band
 "Spiders, Snakes, and Clowns" (2010)
 Imagination Movers: 
 "A Monster Problem" (2009)
 "Haunted Halloween" (2011)
 In a Heartbeat: A Night to Remember (2000)
 Invisible Sister (2015)
 Jake and the Never Land Pirates
 "Night of the Golden Pumpkin" / Trick or Treasure, Tricks, Treats & Treasure / Season of the Sea Witch and Misty's Magical Mix-Up! / Bone's Lucky Dubloon / Pirate Ghost Story and Queen Izzy-bella / 'Jake the Wolf and Witch Hook (2011–16)
 Jessie: 
 "The Whining" (2012)
 "Ghost Bummers" (2013)
 "The Runaway Bride of Frankenstein" (2014)
 "The Ghostest with the Mostest" (2015)
 JoJo's Circus
 "The Legend of Clownfoot Special" (2003)
 Jonas
 "The Tale of the Haunted Firehouse" (2009)
 Just Roll with It: 
 "Root of All Fears" (2019)
 "Aliens Among Us" (2020)
 "You Decide LIVE!" (2021)
 K.C. Undercover:
 "All Howl's Eve" (2015)
 "Virtual Insanity" (2016)
 Kick Buttowski: Suburban Daredevil
 "Kick or Treat" / Dead Man's Roller Coaster (2011)
 Kickin' It: 
 "Boo Gi Nights" (2011)
 "Wazombie Warriors" (2012)
 "Temple of Doom" (2013)
 Kid vs. Kat
 "Trick or Threat" (2009)
 "House of Scream" (2009)
 Kim Possible: October 31 (2002)
 Kirby Buckets: 
 "Flice of the Living Dead" (2014)
 "The School Spirit" (2015)
 Lab Rats: 
 "Night of the Living Virus" (2012)
 "The Haunting of Mission Creek High" (2013)
 "Sheep Shifting" (2016)
 "Spike Fright" (2014)
 "The Curse of the Screaming Skull" (2015)
 Lego Star Wars: Terrifying Tales (2021)
 Lilo & Stitch: The Series
 "Spooky" (2003)
The Lion Guard: 
Beware the Zimwi (2016)
 Little Einsteins
 "A Little Einsteins Halloween" (2005)
 Liv and Maddie: 
 "Kang-a-Rooney" (2013)
 "Helgaween-a-Rooney" (2014)
 "Haunt-a-Rooney" (2015)
 "Scare-A-Rooney" (2016)
 Lizzie McGuire
 "Night of the Day of the Dead" (2001)
 Lloyd in Space
 "Halloween Scary Fun Action Plan" (2003)
 Max Steel
 "Definitely Fear the Reaper" (2014)
 Mickey Mouse: 
 "Ghoul Friend" (2013)
 "The Boiler Room" (2014)
 "Black or White" (2015)
 "The Scariest Story Ever: A Mickey Mouse Halloween Spooktacular" (2017)
 Mickey Mouse Clubhouse:
 "Mickey's Treat" (2006)
 "Mickey's Monster Musical" (2015)
 Mickey Mouse Funhouse:
 "Fifty-Foot Pluto!" (2022)
 "Ghosts of Haunted Gulch" (2022)
 Mickey and the Roadster Racers/Mickey Mouse Mixed-Up Adventures: 
 "The Haunted Hot Rod" / Pete's Ghostly Gala (2017)
 "Goof Mansion" / A Doozy Night of Mystery (2018)
 "The Spooky Spook House!" / Clarabelle's Banana Splitz! (2021)
 Mickey's Tale of Two Witches (2021)
 Mighty Med: 
 "Frighty Med" (2013)
 "Lair, Lair" (2014)
 Milo Murphy's Law
 "Milo Murphy's Halloween Scream-o-Torium!" (2017)
 Mom's Got a Date with a Vampire (2000)
 Motorcity: Mayhem Night (2012)
 The Mouse Factory: Spooks and Magic (1972)
 Mr. Boogedy (1986)
 Mr. Young: Mr. Candy (2012)
 Muppet Babies: 
 "Happy Hallowakka" / The Teeth-Chattering Tale of the Haunted Pancakes (2018)
 "Oh My Gourd" / The Curse of the Wereanimal (2021)
 Muppets Haunted Mansion (2021)
 My Babysitter's a Vampire
 "Halloweird" (2012)
 Once Upon a Halloween (2005)
 Out of the Box
 "Trick or Treat" (1999)
 The Owl House:
 Thanks to Them (2022)
 Pac-Man and the Ghostly Adventures
 "A Berry Scary Night" (2013)
 "The Shadow of the Were-Pac" (2014)
 "Pac's Scary Halloween Part 1" and Part 2 (2015)
 Pair of Kings: 
 "Pair of Clubs" (2011)
 "King vs. Wild" (2012)
 Pat the Dog
 "Trick or Treat Terror" (2017)
 PB&J Otter
 "A Hoohaw Halloween" (2001)
 Phantom of the Megaplex (2000)
 Phil of the Future
 "Halloween" (2004)
 Phineas and Ferb: 
 Season 1, Episode 9: "One Good Scare Ought to Do It!" (2008)
 Season 1, Episode 22: "The Monster of Phineas-n-Ferbenstein!" (2008)
 season 3, Episode 14: "That's the Spirit!"/"The Curse of Candace" (2011)
 Season 4, Episode 18: "Terrifying Tri-State Trilogy of Terror" (2013)
 Season 4, Episode 19: "Drusselsteinoween"/"Face Your Fear" (2013)
 Season 4, Episode 29&30: "Night of the Living Pharmacists" (2014)
 Pickle and Peanut:
 "Gory Agnes" / Haunted Couch (2015)
 "Trick or Treat" (2016)
 The Proud Family
 "A Hero for Halloween" (2002)
 Puppy Dog Pals:
 Return to the Pumpkin Patch / Haunted Howl-oween (2017)
 221B Barker Street / Leaf It To Puppies (2020)
 Halloween Puppy Fashion Show Party / Full Moon Fever (2021)
 The Pumpkin King / The Elf Who Halloween’d (2022)
 Quack Pack
 "The Boy Who Cried Ghost" (1996)
 Randy Cunningham: 9th Grade Ninja:
 "Dawn of the Driscoll" / Night of the Living McFizzles (2012)
 "Let the Wonk One In" / The Curse of Mudfart (2014)
 Recess
 "The Terrifying Tales of Recess" (2001)
 Recess: Taking the Fifth Grade: Episode Three: A Recess Halloween (2003)
 The Replacements
 "Halloween Spirits" (2006)
 Return to Halloweentown (2006)
 Rolie Polie Olie
 "The Legend Of Spookie Ookie" / Oooh Scary / Zowie, Queen Of The Pumpkins (1999)
 Sabrina: The Animated Series
 "Nothin' Says Lovin' Like Somethin' from a Coven" (1999)
 The Scream Team (2002)
 Shake It Up: 
 "Beam It Up" (2011)
 "Haunt It Up" (2013)
 Sheriff Callie's Wild West
 "The Great Halloween Robbery" / The Ghost of the Scary Prairie (2016)
 So Weird: Boo (1999)
 Sofia the First: 
 "Princess Butterfly" (2013)
 "Ghostly Gala" (2014)
 "Cauldronation Day" (2016)
 "Too Cute to Spook" (2017)
 Sonny with a Chance / So Random
 "A So Random Halloween Special" (2010)
 "Iyaz" (2011)
 Special Agent Oso
 "A View to a Mask" / Pumpkin Eyes (2010)
 Spider-Man
 "Halloween Moon" (2017)
 Spidey and His Amazing Friends
 "Trick or TRACE-E" (2021)
 Star vs. the Forces of Evil
 "Hungry Larry" (2016)
 Stuck in the Middle
 "Stuck in a Merry Scary" (2017)
 The Suite Life of Zack & Cody / The Suite Life on Deck
 "The Ghost of Suite 613" (2005)
 "Scary Movie" (2006)
 "Arwinstein" (2007)
 "Sea Monster Mash" (2008)
 "Can You Dig It?" (2010)
 "The Ghost and Mr. Martin" (2010)
 Super Robot Monkey Team Hyperforce Go!
 "Seacon of the Skull" (2005)
 Sydney to the Max: The Hunt for The Rad October (2021)
Tangled: The Series
 "The Wrath of Ruthless Ruth" (2017)
Teacher's Pet
 "The Tale of the Telltale Taffy" (2001)
Timon & Pumbaa: 
Guatemala Malarkey (1995)
Jamaica Mistake? (1996)
Werehog of London (1999)
Ghost Boosters (1999)
 That's So Raven / Raven's Home
Don't Have a Cow (2003)
Cake Fear (2005)
 "The Baxtercism of Levi Grayson" (2017)
 "Switch-or-Treat" (2018)
 "Creepin' It Real" (2019)
 "Don't Trust the G In Apartment B" (2020)
 "The Girl Who Cried Tasha" (2022)
 Tower of Terror (1997)
T.O.T.S.
 "A Spooky Delivery" (2020)
Toy Story of Terror! (2013)
Twitches (2005)
Twitches Too (2007)
Under Wraps (1997)
 Under Wraps (2021)
 Under Wraps 2 (2022)
 Vampirina:
Hauntleyween / Franklenflower (2018)
Trick or Treaters / Play It Again Vee (2019)
Jumping Jack-o-Lanterns / Freeze Our Guest (2019)
The Vamp-Opera / This Haunted House Is Closed (2019)
The Villains of Valley View: "Havoc-ween" (2022)
The Weekenders
 "Nevermore" (2003)
Walk the Prank
 "Prank or Treat" (2016)
Wander Over Yonder:
The Pet (2013)
The Gift 2: The Giftening (2014)
The Heebie Jeebies (2016)
 The Wonderful World of Mickey Mouse
 "Houseghosts" (2021)
Wizards of Waverly Place
 "Halloween" (2009)
Yin Yang Yo
 "The Howl of the Weenie" (2008)
Zeke and Luther
 "Haunted Board" (2009)
 The ZhuZhus:
 Zombie Sleep Over (2016)
 The Pumpkin Whisperers (2017)

Winnie the Pooh
 Welcome to Pooh Corner
 "Because it's Halloween!" (1984)
 Boo to You Too! Winnie the Pooh (1996)
 The Book of Pooh
 "The Book of Boo!" (2002)
 Pooh's Heffalump Halloween Movie (2005)
 My Friends Tigger & Pooh: 
 "The Hundred Acre Wood Haunt" (2008)
 "Darby's Halloween Case" (2009)

Ultimate Spider-Man
 Season 2, Episode 21: Blade (2013)
 Season 2, Episode 22: The Howling Commandos (2013)
 Season 3, Episode 21: Halloween Night at the Museum (2014)
 Season 4, Episode 20: Strange Little Halloween (2016)

Goosebumps
 Season 1, Episodes 1 and 2: The Haunted Mask (Part 1) and (Part 2) (1995)
 Season 2, Episode 10: Attack of the Jack-O'-Lanterns (1996)
 Season 2 Episodes 11 and 12: The Haunted Mask II (Part 1) and (Part 2) (1996)

Nickelodeon/Nicktoons/Nick Jr.
 100 Deeds for Eddie McDowd
 "All Howls Eve" (2000)
 100 Things to Do Before High School
 "Have the Best Halloween School Day Ever Thing!" (2015)
 Aaahh!!! Real Monsters
 "The Switching Hour" (1994)
 Abby Hatcher
 "Trick or Treat Otis" (2019)
 The Adventures of Jimmy Neutron: Boy Genius
 "Nightmare in Retroville" (2003)
 The Adventures of Paddington
 "Paddington and Halloween" (2020)
 "Paddington and the Halloween Mystery/Paddington's Campfire Stories" (2022)
 The Adventures of Pete and Pete (Season 2, Episode 7): Halloweenie (1994)
 All That
 "CNCO" (2019)
 Allegra's Window
 "My Own Monster" (1994)
 The Angry Beavers
 "The Day the World Got Really Screwed Up" (1998)
 Are You Afraid of the Dark?: 
 "The Tale of the Twisted Claw" (1991)
 "The Tale of the Laughing in the Dark" (1992)
 "The Tale of the Midnight Ride" (1994)
 As Told By Ginger
 "I Spy a Witch" (2001)
 Avatar: The Last Airbender
 "The Puppetmaster" (2007)
 Baby Shark's Big Show!
 "Baby Shark's Haunted Halloween" / Wavey Jones' Locker (2021)
 Back at the Barnyard
 "Back at the Booyard" (2009)
 The Backyardigans: 
 "It's Great To Be A Ghost!" (2004)
 "Monster Detectives" (2005)
 "Scared Of You" (2006)
 "The Funnyman Boogeyman" (2009)
 Bella and the Bulldogs
 "Sha-Boo! Ya" (2015)
 Big Nate: "Ghostly Coven of Man Witches" (2022)
 Big Time Rush: "Big Time Halloween" (2010)
 Blaze and the Monster Machines
 "Truck or Treat" (2015)
 "Monster Machine Halloween" (2022)
 Blue's Clues: 
 "What is Blue Afraid Of?" (1997)
 "Blue's Big Costume Party" (2000)
 Blue's Clues & You!: 
 "Spooky Costume Party with Blue" (2020)
 "The Ghost of the Living Room" (2021)
 "The Legend of the Jack O'Lantern" (2022)
 Breadwinners
 "Night of the Living Bread" (2014)
 Bubble Guppies 
 "Haunted House Party" (2011)
 "Trick-or-Treat, Mr. Grumpfish!" (2016)
 "Werewolves of Bubbledon!" (2021)
 Bunsen Is a Beast: Beast Halloween Ever (2017)
 Butterbean's Cafe: "A Bean for Halloween" (2019)
 CatDog
 "CatDogula" (1999)
 Catscratch
 "Scaredy Cat" (2005)
 ChalkZone
 "Pumpkin Love" / Chip of Fools / Irresistible /  Please Let Me In (2003)
 Danny Phantom
 "Fright Night" (2004)
 Dora and Friends: Into the City!
 "Trick or Treat" (2015)
 Dora the Explorer: 
 "Boo!" (2003)
 "Halloween Parade" (2011)
 Doug
 "Doug's Halloween Adventure" (1994)
 Drake & Josh
 "Alien Invasion" (2006) 
 Eureeka's Castle
 "It Came from Beneath the Bed" (1991)
 The Fairly OddParents: 
Scary Godparents (2002)
Poltergeeks (2011)
Scary GodCouple (2013)
 Fanboy & Chum Chum
 "There Will Be Shrieks" (2011)
 Franklin
 "Franklin's Halloween" (1997)
 Franklin and Friends
 "It's Halloween Franklin!" (2013)
 The Fresh Beat Band
 "Glow for it" (2010)
 "Ghost Band" (2011)
 Fresh Beat Band of Spies
 "Ghost of Rock" (2015)
 Game Shakers
 "Scare Tripless" (2015)
 Go, Diego, Go
 "Freddie the Fruit Bat Saves Halloween!" (2008)
 Group Chat
 "Sliming for Apples" (2020)
 Gullah Gullah Island
 "Gullah Gullah Ghoul-Land" (1997)
 Harvey Beaks:
 "Le Corn Maze... OF DOOM; Harvey Isn't Scary" (2015)
 "Technoscare" (2016)
 The Haunted Hathaways: 
 "Haunted Halloween" (2013)
 "The Haunted Thundermans" (2014)
 Henry Danger:
 "Jasper Danger" (2014)
 "Danger Things" (2018)
 Hey Arnold!: 
 "Arnold's Halloween" (1997)
 "Headless Cabbie" / Friday the 13th (1999)
 How to Rock
 "How to Rock Halloween" (2012)
 iCarly: 
iScream on Halloween (2007)
iHalfoween (2012)
 Invader Zim
 "Halloween Spectacular Spooky Doom" (2001)
 It's Pony
 "Scarecrow" / Cornapples (2020)
 Kenan & Kel
 "Two Heads Are Better Than None" (2000)
 Knight Squad
 "Fright Knight" (2018)
 Kung Fu Panda: Legends of Awesomeness
 "The Po Who Cried Ghost" (2012)
 LazyTown: 
 "Cry Dinosaur" (2004)
 "Haunted Castle" (2006)
 Lego Jurassic World: Legend of Isla Nublar
 "The Haunted and the Hunted" (2020)
 Little Bear: 
 "How to Scare Ghosts" (1997)
 "Goblin Night" (1998)
 "Little Goblin Bear" (1999)
 Little Bill
 "The Halloween Costume" / The Haunted Halloween Party (2001)
 Maggie and the Ferocious Beast
 "Trick or Treat" (2002)
 Max & Ruby: 
 "Max's Halloween" (2002)
 "Max and Ruby's Perfect Pumpkin / Max's Jack-o-Lantern / Max's Big Boo" (2007)
 "Ruby and the Beast / Max and Ruby's Halloween House / Max's Trick or Treat" (2012)
 "Ruby's Party" (2017)
 Middlemost Post:
 "Scary Stories to Tell Your Cloud / The Pumpkin Pageant" (2021)
 "More Scary Stories to Tell Your Cloud" (2022)
 The Mighty B!: Catatonic (2009)
 Monsters vs. Aliens: Mutant Pumpkins from Outer Space (2009)
 Monsters vs. Aliens
 "Curse of the Man-Beast" (2013) 
 "It Came From Level Z" (2013)
 "I Predict Horror" (2013) 
 "My Monster, My Master" (2013)
 "This Ball Must Be Dodged" (2013)
 "It Spoke With Authority" (2013)
 Moose and Zee
 "I Don't Like Candy Corn" (2003)
 Mutt & Stuff
 "The Happy Hallowoof Party" (2016)
 My Life as a Teenage Robot: 
 "Raggedy Android" (2003)
 "The Return of Raggedy Android" (2003)
 The Mystery Files of Shelby Woo
 "The Haunted House Mystery" (1998)
 Mystery Magical Special (1986)
 Ned's Declassified School Survival Guide
 "Halloween & Vampires, Werewolves, Ghosts and Zombies" (2006)
 Nella the Princess Knight
 "The Halloween Hippogriff / King Gork the First" (2017)
 Ni Hao, Kai-Lan
 "Ni Hao, Halloween" (2008)
 Nicky, Ricky, Dicky & Dawn: 
 "Field of Brains" (2014)
 "Scaredy Dance" (2014)
 Oobi
 "Halloween" (2003)
 Ollie's Pack
 "Nightmare Frightscare" (2020)
 The Penguins of Madagascar
 "I Was a Penguin Zombie" (2009)
 Pig Goat Banana Cricket
 "Zombie Brohiems" (2015)
 Planet Sheen
 "There's Something About Scary" (2010)
 Rabbids Invasion
 "Rabbid Halloween" (2014)
 Rainbow Rangers
 "Spooky Costume Party" (2020)
 The Ren & Stimpy Show
 "Haunted House" (1992)
 Rocket Power
 "The Night Before" (1999)
 Rocko's Modern Life
 "Sugar-Frosted Frights" / Ed is Dead: A Thriller! (1995)
 Salute Your Shorts
 "Zeke the Plumber" (1991)
 Sam & Cat
 "DollSitting" (2013)
 Sanjay and Craig:
 "Tufflips' Tales of Terror" (2014)
 "Halloweenies" (2016)
 Santiago of the Seas
 "The Mysterious Island" / Mystery of the Vam-Pirates (2021)
 "Peek-a-BOO!"/"Night of the Witches" (2022)
 School Of Rock:
 "Welcome To My Nightmare" (2016)
 Shimmer and Shine
 "A Very Genie Halloweeny" (2015)
 Side Hustle
 "Scare Bear" (2020)
 The Smurfs: "The Magic Pumpkin/Lost Cat"
(2022)
 Sunny Day
 "Pumpkin Pursuit" (2017)
 Supah Ninjas
 "X" (2011)
 The Secret World of Alex Mack
 "The Secret" (1995) 
 Team Umizoomi: "The Ghost Family Costume Party" (2010)
 That Girl Lay Lay: 
 "Ha-Lay-Lay-Ween" (2021)
 "Freaky Fri-Day-Day" (2022)
 The Thundermans: 
 "The Haunted Thundermans" (2014)
 "Happy Heroween" (2016)
 T.U.F.F. Puppy: 
 "The Curse of King Mutt" (2011)
 "Happy Howl-o-Ween" (2012)
 "Hide and Ghost Seek" (2015)
 Unfiltered: Happy Slime-o-ween! (2020)
 Victorious
 "Terror on Cupcake Street" (2011)
 Wallykazam!
 "Mustache Day" (2014)
 Wayside
 "Rat in Shining Armor" (2007) 
 "Be True to Your Elf" (2007)
 Weinerville
 "The Weinerville Halloween Special" (1993)
 Wild Grinders:
 Wild Zombies/Scream a Little Scream (2012)
 Texas Skateboard Horrorland Zombie Activity 3, Parts 1 & 2 (2013)
 The Wild Thornberrys:
 "Blood Sisters" (1998)
 "Spirited Away" (2000)
 Winx Club
 "The Fourth Witch" (2006)
 Wonder Pets!
 "Save the Black Kitten!" (2006)
 Wow! Wow! Wubbzy!:
 "Monster Madness" / The Last Leaf (2006)
 "The Ghost of Wuzzleburg" / March of the Pumpkins (2008)
 Yo Gabba Gabba!
 "Halloween" (2007)
 You Can't Do That on Television
 "Halloween" (1984)
 Young Dylan:
 "Haunted Hills" (2021)
 "Saturday School" (2022)
 Zoey 101
 "Haunted House" (2005)

The Loud House/The Casagrandes
 The Loud House: 
 "The Price of Admission" / "One Flu Over the Loud House" (2016)
 "Tricked!" (2017)
 "Jeers for Fears" / "Tea Tale Heart" (2018)
 "Tails of Woe" / "Last Loud on Earth" (2019)
 "Ghosted!" (2020)
 "Fright Bite" (2021)
 "Great Lakes Freakout!" (2022)
 The Casagrandes
 "New Haunts" / "Croaked!" (2019)
 "Fails From The Crypt" / "Bad Cluck" (2020)
 "Curse of the Candy Goblin" (2021)
 "Phantom Freakout" (2022)

PAW Patrol
 "Pups and the Ghost Pirate" (2013)
 "Pups Save a Ghost" / "Pups Save a Show" (2014)
 "Pups Save a Sniffle" / "Pups and the Ghost Cabin" (2015)
 "Mission PAW: Royally Spooked" / "Pups Save Monkey-Dinger" (2017)
 "Pups Save the Trick-or-Treaters" / "Pups Save an Out of Control Mini Patrol" (2018)
 "Pups and the Werepuppy" / "Pups Save a Sleepwalking Mayor" (2018)
 "Pups Rescue a Rescuer" / "Pups Save the Phantom of the Frog Pond" (2020)
 "Pups vs. Ouchy Paws" / "Pups Save a Glow-in-the-Dark Party" (2021)
 "Pups Stop the Return of Humsquatch/Pups Save a Lonely Ghost" (2022)

Power Rangers
 Power Rangers Dino Charge
 "The Ghostest with the Mostest" (2015)
 Power Rangers Dino Super Charge
 "Trick or Trial" (2016)
 Power Rangers Ninja Steel
 "Grave Robber" (2017)
 Power Rangers Samurai
 "Party Monsters" (2011)
 Power Rangers Super Samurai
 "Trickster Treat" (2012)
 Power Rangers Megaforce
 "Raising Spirits" (2013)
 Power Rangers Super Ninja Steel: "Monster Mix-Up" (2018)
 Power Rangers Beast Morphers
 "Hypnotic Halloween" (2019)
 Power Rangers Dino Fury
 "Old Foes" (2021)

Rugrats
 Rugrats
 "Candy Bar Creep Show" / "Monster in the Garage" (1992)
 "Ghost Story" (1999)
 "Curse of the Werewuff" (2002)
 All Grown Up!
 "TP + KF" (2007)
 Rugrats (2021)
 "The Werewoof Hunter" (2021)
 "Night Crawler/Goblets & Goblins" (2022)

SpongeBob SquarePants
 SpongeBob SquarePants
 "Scaredy Pants" / "I Was a Teenage Gary" (1999)
 "Graveyard Shift" (2002)
 "The Curse of Bikini Bottom" (2009) 
 "Ghoul Fools" (2011)
 "Don't Look Now" / "Seance Shmeance" (2013)
 "The Legend of Boo-Kini Bottom" (2017)
 "Krabby Patty Creature Feature" (2017)
 "The Night Patty" (2018)
 "The Ghost of Plankton" (2019)
 "A Cabin in the Kelp" (2019)
 "Squidferatu" / "Slappy Daze" (2022)
 Kamp Koral: SpongeBob's Under Years
 "Are You Afraid of the Dork?" (2021)
 "Camp Spirit" (2022)
 The Patrick Star Show
 "The Haunting of Star House" (2021)
 "Terror at 20,000 Leagues" (2021)

Teenage Mutant Ninja Turtles
The Curse of Savanti Romero (2017)
The Crypt of Dracula (2017)
The Frankenstein Experiment (2017)
Monsters Among Us (2017)

Animaniacs
 Animaniacs (1993): 
 (Season 1, Episode 29): Hot, Bothered & Bedeviled / Moon Over Minerva (1993)
 (Season 1, Episode 30): Draculee, Draculaa / Phranken-Runt (1993)
 (Season 1, Episode 62): Scare Happy Slappy / Witch One / MacBeth (1994)
Animaniacs (2020):  (Season 1, Episode 11) Phantomaniacs | Fear and Laughter in Burbank | Bride of Pinky | Things That Go Bump in the Night (2020)
 Pinky and the Brain: (Season 3, Episode 17) A Pinky and the Brain Halloween (1997)

Looney Tunes
 Bugs Bunny's Howl-oween Special (1977)
 The Bugs Bunny Mystery Special (1980)
 Tiny Toon Adventures: 
 "Toons From the Crypt" (1992)
 "The Horror of Slumber Party Mountain" (1992)
 "Tiny Toons Night Ghoulery" (1994)
 Baby Looney Tunes
 "Log Cabin Fever" / A Mid-Autumn Night's Scream (2005)
 The Looney Tunes Show
 "The Muh-Muh-Muh-Murder" (2012)
 New Looney Tunes: 
 "The IMPoster" (2016))
 "Duck Duck Ghost" (2018)
 Looney Tunes Cartoons: 
 "Boo! Appetweet" (2020)
 "Bugs Bunny’s Howl-O-Skreem Spooktacula" (2022)

Scooby-Doo
 The Scooby-Doo Show: 
 "The Headless Horseman of Halloween" (1976)
 "To Switch a Witch" (1978)
 The New Scooby and Scrappy-Doo Show
 "A Halloween Hassle at Dracula's Castle" (1984)
 Scooby-Doo Meets the Boo Brothers (1987)
 A Pup Named Scooby-Doo
 "Ghost Who's Coming to Dinner?" (1988)
 The Scooby-Doo Project (1999)
 What's New, Scooby-Doo?
 "A Scooby-Doo Halloween" (2003)
 Scooby-Doo! and the Goblin King (2008)
 Scooby-Doo! and the Spooky Scarecrow (2013)
 Be Cool, Scooby-Doo!
 "Halloween" (2017)
 Happy Halloween, Scooby-Doo! (2020)
 Trick or Treat Scooby-Doo! (2022)

American drama
 7th Heaven: "Halloween" (1996) - Season 1, Episode 6
 The Affair: "504" (2019)
 Chicago Fire: "All the Proof" (2018)
 Chicago Hope: "Who Turned Out the Lights?" (1995)
 Dead Like Me: "Haunted" (2004) - Season 2, Episode 15
 Euphoria: "The Next Episode" (2019)
 Evil: "October 31" (2019)
 The Fitzpatricks: "Halloween" (1977)
 I'll Fly Away: "Beyond Here Dar Be Dragons" (1991)
 Life Goes On: "Halloween" (1990)
 Lou Grant: "Ghosts" (1982)
 Models Inc.: "Clash of the Super Vixens" (1994)
 The Practice: "Search and Seizure" (1997)
 Private Practice: "All in the Family" (2010)
 Pushing Daisies: "Girth" (2007)
 Quarry: "Carnival of Souls" (2016)
 Route 66: "Lizard's Leg and Owlet's Wing" (1962)
 Scorpion: "True Colors" (2014)
 The L Word: Generation Q: "Last to Know" (2022)
 Thirtysomething: "The Haunting of DAA" (1990)
 This Is Us: "The 20s" (2017) - Season 2, Episode 6
 Trauma: "Masquerade" (2009)
 True Blood: "And When I Die" (2011) - Season 4, Episode 12
 Truth Be Told: "All That Was Lost" (2020)
 The Waltons: "The Changeling" (1978)
 Yellowjackets: "Blood Hive" (2021)
 Zorro: "The Ghost of the Mission" (1957)

Desperate Housewives
 Desperate Housewives: "Now I Know, Don't Be Scared" (2007) - Season 4, Episode 6
 Desperate Housewives: "Excited and Scared" (2010) - Season 7, Episode 6
 Desperate Housewives: "Witch's Lament" (2011) - Season 8, Episode 6

Dr. Quinn, Medicine Woman
 Dr. Quinn, Medicine Woman: "Halloween" (1993) - Season 2, Episode 3
 Dr. Quinn, Medicine Woman: "Halloween II" (1994) - Season 3, Episode 6
 Dr. Quinn, Medicine Woman: "Halloween III" (1995) - Season 4, Episode 5

ER
 ER: "Ghosts" (1996) - Season 3, Episode 5
 ER: "Masquerade" (1998) - Season 5, Episode 5
 ER: "A Hopeless Wound" (2002) - Season 9, Episode 5
 ER: "Haunted" (2008) - Season 15, Episode 5

Grey's Anatomy
 Grey's Anatomy: "Haunt You Every Day" (2007) - Season 4, Episode 5
 Grey's Anatomy: "Thriller" (2013) - Season 10, Episode 7
Grey's Anatomy: "Flowers Grow Out of My Grave" (2018) - Season 15, Episode 6
Grey's Anatomy: "Whistlin' Past the Graveyard" (2019) - Season 16, Episode 6
Grey's Anatomy: "Haunted" (2022) - Season 19, Episode 4

Hart of Dixie
 Hart of Dixie: "The Undead & The Unsaid" (2011)
 Hart of Dixie: "Walkin' After Midnight" (2012)
 Hart of Dixie: "Help Me Make It Through the Night" (2013)

Lassie
 Lassie: "Trapped" (1958)
 Lassie: "Wings of the Ghost" (1971)

Little House on the Prairie
 Little House on the Prairie: "The Monster of Walnut Grove" (1976)
 Little House on the Prairie: "The Halloween Dream" (1979)

Our House
 Our House: "Small Steps Up a Tall Mountain" (1986)
 Our House: "The Haunting" (1987)

The Resident 

 The Resident: "Nightmares" (2018)
 The Resident: "Belief System" (2019)
 The Resident: "The Thinnest Veil" (2021)

St. Elsewhere
 St. Elsewhere: "Haunted" (1985)
 St. Elsewhere: "Night of the Living Bed" (1987)

Action
 Alias: "Doppelgänger" (2001)
 The New Adventures of Beans Baxter: "A Nightmare on Beans' Street" (1987)
 Relic Hunter: "Vampire's Kiss" (2001)
 Walker Texas Ranger: "The Children of Halloween" (1998)

Chuck
 "Chuck Versus the Sandworm" (2007)
 "Chuck Versus the Aisle of Terror" (2010)

The Dukes of Hazzard
 The Dukes of Hazzard: "The Ghost of General Lee" (1979)
 The Dukes of Hazzard: "The Hazzardville Horror" (1980)

The Fall Guy
 The Fall Guy: "October the 31st" (1984)
 The Fall Guy: "October the Thirty Second" (1985)

MacGyver
 MacGyver: "Ghost Ship" (1987)
 MacGyver: "The Secret of Parker House" (1988)
 MacGyver: "Halloween Knights" (1989)
 MacGyver: "Lesson in Evil" (1990)

Crime and mystery
 21 Jump Street: "Old Haunts in a New Age" (1989)
 Adam-12: "Trick or Treat" (1991)
 Agatha Christie's Poirot: "Hallowe'en Party" (2010) - Season 12, Episode 2
 Blue Bloods: "Nightmares" (2012)
 Bones: "Mummy in the Maze" (2007) - Season 3, Episode 5
 Bones: "The Resurrection in the Remains" (2015) - Season 11, Episode 5
 Boomtown: "All Hallow's Eve" (2002)
 Dexter: "Let's Give the Boy a Hand" (2006) - Season 1, Episode 4
 Encyclopedia Brown: "The Case of the Ghostly Rider" (1990)
 Hunter: "Killer in a Halloween Mask" (1985)
 Magnum, P.I.: "The Woman on the Beach" (1981)
 Magnum, P.I. (2018 TV series): "Make It 'til Dawn" (2019)
 McMillan and Wife: "The Devil You Say" (1973)
 The Mentalist: "Red Scare" (2009) - Season 2, Episode 5
 Mike Hammer, Private Eye: "Halloween" (1997)
 Monk: "Mr. Monk Goes Home Again" (2005) - Season 4, Episode 2
 Numbers: "Dreamland" (2009)
 Perry Mason: "The Case of the Dodging Domino" (1962)
 The Player: "The Norseman" (2015)
 Psych (Season 6, Episode 3): "This Episode Sucks" (2011)
 Sleepy Hollow: "Dead Men Tell No Tales" (2015) - Season 3, Episode 5
 The Snoop Sisters: "The Devil Made Me Do It" (1974)
 Stalker: "The Haunting" (2014)
 Starsky and Hutch: "The Vampire" (1976)

9-1-1
 9-1-1: "Haunted" (2018) - Season 2, Episode 7
 9-1-1: "Monsters" (2019) - Season 3, Episode 6
 9-1-1: "Ghost Stories" (2021) - Season 5, Episode 7

Castle
 Castle: "Vampire Weekend" (2009) - Season 2, Episode 6
 Castle: "Demons" (2011) - Season 4, Episode 6
 Castle: "PhDead" (2015) - Season 8, Episode 3

CHiPs
 CHiPs: "Trick or Trick" (1978)
 CHiPs: "Rock Devil Rock" (1982)

The Commish
 The Commish: "Nothing to Fear But..." (1991)
 The Commish: "The Witches of Eastbridge" (1992)

Criminal Minds
 Criminal Minds: "About Face" (2007) - Season 3, Episode 6
 Criminal Minds: "Devil's Night" (2010) - Season 6, Episode 6
 Criminal Minds: "The Good Earth" (2012) - Season 8, Episode 5
 Criminal Minds: "In the Blood" (2013) - Season 9, Episode 6
 Criminal Minds: "Boxed In" (2014) - Season 10, Episode 5
 Criminal Minds: "Keeper" (2016) - Season 12, Episode 4

CSI (franchise)
 CSI: Miami: "Hell Night" (2004)
 CSI: Miami: "Curse of the Coffin" (2006)
 CSI: Crime Scene Investigation: "The Chick Chop Flick Shop" (2007)
 CSI: NY: "Boo" (2007)
 CSI: Crime Scene Investigation: "Let It Bleed" (2008)
 CSI: NY: "Get Me Out of Here!" (2011)

The Hardy Boys/Nancy Drew Mysteries
 The Hardy Boys/Nancy Drew Mysteries: "The Mystery of the Haunted House" (1977)
 The Hardy Boys/Nancy Drew Mysteries: "A Haunting We Will Go" (1977)
 The Hardy Boys/Nancy Drew Mysteries: "The Hardy Boys and Nancy Drew Meet Dracula" (Part 1) (1977)
 The Hardy Boys/Nancy Drew Mysteries: "The Hardy Boys and Nancy Drew Meet Dracula" (Part 2) (1977)
 The Hardy Boys/Nancy Drew Mysteries: "The House on Possessed Hill" (1978)
 The Hardy Boys/Nancy Drew Mysteries: "Voodoo Doll" (Part 1) (1978)
 The Hardy Boys/Nancy Drew Mysteries: "Voodoo Doll" (Part 2) (1978)

Hawaii Five-0
Hawaii Five-0: "Ka Iwi Kapu" ("Sacred Bones") (2011)
Hawaii Five-0: "Mohai" ("Offering") (2012)
Hawaii Five-0: "Kupouli ‘la" ("Broken") (2013)
Hawaii Five-0: "Ho‘oma‘ike" ("Unmasked") (2014)
Hawaii Five-0: "Na Pilikua Nui" ("Monsters") (2015)
Hawaii Five-0: "Ka hale ho‘okauweli" ("House of horrors") (2016)
Hawaii Five-0: "Kama‘oma‘o, ka ‘aina huli hana" ("At Kama'oma'o, the land of activities") (2017)
Hawaii Five-0:" "A‘ohe mea ‘imi a ka maka" ("Nothing more the eyes to search for") (2018)
Hawaii Five-0: "He ‘oi‘o kuhihewa; he kaka ola i ‘ike ‘ia e ka makaula" ("Don't blame ghosts and spirits for one's troubles; a human is responsible") (2019)

Law & Order (franchise)
  Law & Order: "Out of Control" (1991)
 Law & Order: Criminal Intent: "Masquerade" (2006)
 Law & Order: Special Victims Unit: 
 "Missing Pieces" (2011)
 Law & Order: Special Victims Unit: "Glasgowman's Wrath" (2014)

Murder, She Wrote
 Murder, She Wrote: "Reflections of the Mind" (1985)
 Murder, She Wrote: "Night of the Headless Horseman" (1987)
 Murder, She Wrote: "Fire Burn, Cauldron Bubble" (1989)
 Murder, She Wrote: "The Witch's Curse" (1992)
 Murder, She Wrote: "Legacy of Borbey House" (1993)
 Murder, She Wrote: "Nan's Ghost" (1995)

NCIS (franchise)
 NCIS: "Witch Hunt" (2006)
 NCIS: "Murder 2.0" (2008)
 NCIS: "Code of Conduct" (2009)
 NCIS: "Cracked" (2010)
 NCIS: "Oil & Water" (2013)
 NCIS: "Parental Guidance Suggested" (2014)
 NCIS: New Orleans: "Master of Horror" (2014)
 NCIS: "Viral" (2015)
 NCIS: "Shell Game" (2016)
 NCIS: "Beneath the Surface" (2018)

The Wild Wild West
 The Wild Wild West: "The Night of the Druid's Blood" (1966)
 The Wild Wild West: "The Night of the Big Blast" (1966)
 The Wild Wild West: "The Night of the Wolf" (1967)

Supernatural, fantasy and sci-fi
666 Park Avenue: "A Crowd of Demons" (2012) - Season 1, Episode 5
 The Amazing Spider-Man: "The Kirkwood Haunting" (1978)
 Angel: "Life of the Party" (2003) - Season 5, Episode 5
 Beyond Belief: Fact or Fiction: For the Record/Halloween/Precious/Get Your Kicks at Motel 66/Phantom Drifter (2000)
 Blood Drive: "In the Crimson Halls of Kane Hill" (2017)
 Constantine: "The Rage of Caliban" (2014) - Season 1, Episode 6
 Crazyhead: "Beaver With a Chainsaw" (2016) - Season 1, Episode 6
 Dark Angel: "Boo" (2001) - Season 2, Episode 5
 Dead Like Me: "Haunted" (2004) - Season 2, Episode 15
 Early Edition: "Halloween" (1998)
 Eastwick: "Bonfire and Betrayal" (2009) - Season 1, Episode 6
 Eerie, Indiana: "America's Scariest Home Video" (1991)
 The Flash (1990 TV series): "Double Vision" (1990)
The Flash (2014 TV series): "There Will Be Blood" (2019)
 FlashForward: "Scary Monsters and Super Creeps" (2009)
 Freddy's Nightmares: "Freddy's Tricks and Treats" (1988)
 Friday the 13th: The Series: "Hellowe'en" (1987)
 Galactica 1980: "The Night the Cylons Landed" (1980)
 Ghostwatch: (BBC1) (1992)
 Grimm: "La Llorona" (2012) - Season 2, Episode 9
 Haunting of Hill House: 'Witness Marks" (2018) - Season 1, Episode 8
 Haven: "Real Estate" (2012)
 Hercules: The Legendary Journeys: "Mummy Dearest" (1996)
 The Incredible Hulk: "The Haunted" (1979)
 K-9: "Regeneration" (2009)
 Kamen Rider OOO: "Drenched, the Past, and the Scorching Combo" (2010)
 Legends of Tomorrow:
 "Phone Home" (2017) 
 "Witch Hunt" (2018) 
 Medium: "Bite Me" (2009)
 Millennium: "The Curse of Frank Black" (1997)
 Nancy Drew: "The Haunted Ring" (2019)
 Night Gallery: "Fright Night" (1972)
 Once Upon a Time: "Beauty" (2017) - Season 7, Episode 4
 The Pretender: "Back from the Dead Again" (1997)
 Reaper: "Leon" (2007)
 The Secret Circle: "Masked" (2011) - Season 1, Episode 7
 Servant: "Boo!" (2023) - Season 4, Episode 4
 Special Unit 2: "The Eve" (2001)
 Star Trek: "Catspaw" (1967)
 Stitchers: "When Darkness Falls" (2015)
 Stranger Things: "Chapter Two: Trick or Treat, Freak" (2017) - Season 2, Episode 2
 Supergirl: "Survivors" (2016) - Season 2. Episode 4
 The Twilight Zone: "The Howling Man" (1960) - Season 2, Episode 5
 Ultraman Tiga: "On Halloween Night" (1996)
 Werewolf by Night (2022)
 Ultraman R/B: "Everyone Is Friends" (2018)
 What If...?: "What If... Zombies?!" (2021)
 Xena: Warrior Princess: "Girls Just Wanna Have Fun" (1996)

Amazing Stories
1985
"Ghost Train" (1985)
"Mummy, Daddy" (1985)
"Boo!" (1986)
"Go to the Head of the Class" (1986)
"Welcome to My Nightmare" (1986)
2020: "Dynoman and the Volt!" (2020)

American Horror Story
 AHS: Murder House: "Halloween" (2011) - Season 1, Episodes 4 & 5
 AHS: Asylum: "Tricks and Treats" (2012) - Season 2, Episode 2
 AHS: Coven: "Fearful Pranks Ensue" (2013) - Season 3, Episode 4
 AHS: Freak Show: "Edward Mordrake" (2014) - Season 4, Episodes 3 & 4
 AHS: Hotel: "Devil's Night" (2015) - Season 5, Episode 4
 AHS: Roanoke: "Chapter 7" (2016) - Season 6, Episode 7
 AHS: Cult: "Drink the Kool-Aid" (2017) - Season 7, Episode 9
 AHS: Apocalyspe: "Sojourn" (2018) - Season 8, Episode 8
 AHS: 1984: "Episode 100" (2019) - Season 9, Episode 6
 AHS: Double Feature: "Blood Buffet" (2021) - Season 10, Episode 4

Buffy the Vampire Slayer/Angel
 Buffy the Vampire Slayer: 
 "Halloween" (1997) - Season 2, Episode 6
 "Fear, Itself" (1999) - Season 4, Episode 4
 "All the Way" (2001) - Season 6, Episode 6
Angel: "Life of the Party (Angel episode)" (2003) - Season 5, Episode 5

Charmed
  "All Halliwell's Eve" (2000) - Season 3, Episode 4
  "Kill Billie, Volume 1" (2005) - Season 8, Episode 6

Charmed (2018)
 "Sweet Tooth" (2018) - Season 1, Episode 3
 "Be Careful What You Witch For" (2019) - Season 2, Episode 22

Chilling Adventures of Sabrina
 "Chapter 1: October Country" (2018) - Season 1, Episode 1
 "Chapter 2: Dark Baptism" (2018) - Season 1, Episode 2

Chucky
 "Give Me Something Good to Eat' (2021)
 "Halloween II" (2022)

Ghost Hunters
see also List of Ghost Hunters episodes#Specials
 "Halloween Special" (2005)
 "Ghost Hunters Live Stanley Hotel Halloween Special" (2006)
 "Ghost Hunters Live Waverly Hills Sanatorium Halloween Special" (2007)
 "Ghost Hunters Live Fort Delaware Halloween Special" (2008)
 "Ghost Hunters Live Essex County Sanitarium Halloween Special" (2009)
 "Ghost Hunters Live Buffalo Central Terminal Halloween Special" (2010)
 "Ghost Hunters Live Pennhurst State School and Hospital Halloween Special" (2011)

Ghost Whisperer
 "Weight of What Was" (2007) - Season 3, Episode 5
 "Head Over Heels" (2009) - Season 5, Episode 6

Good Witch
 "Good Witch Halloween" (2015) - Season 2, Episode 0
 "Secrets of Grey House" (2016) - Season 3, Episode 0
 "Good Witch Spellbound" (2017) - Season 4, Episode 0
 "Tale of Two Hearts" (2018) - Season 5, Episode 0
 "Curse from a Rose" (2019) - Season 6, Episode 0

The Greatest American Hero
 "The Beast in Black" (1981)
 "A Chicken in Every Pot" (1982)
 "The Devil and the Deep Blue Sea" (1982)
 "The Resurrection of Carlini" (1982)

Haunted Lives: True Ghost Stories
 "Episode 1" (1991)
 "Episode 2" (1992)
 "Episode 3" AKA "Real Ghosts" (1995)

Highway to Heaven
  "The Devil and Jonathan Smith" (1985)
  "I Was a Middle Aged Werewolf" (1987)

Into the Dark
  "The Body" (2018)
  "Uncanny Annie" (2019)

Knight Rider
 "Halloween Knight" (1984)
  "Voodoo Knight" (1986)

Lois & Clark: The New Adventures of Superman
 "When Irish Eyes Are Killing" (1995) 
  "Never on Sunday" (1996)
  "Ghosts" (1996)

Night Man
 Night Man: "Constant Craving" (1998)
 Night Man: "Book of the Dead" (1998)
 Night Man: "Fear City" (1998)

Quantum Leap
  "The Boogieman" (1990)
  "The Curse of Ptah-Hotep" (1992)
 '"Blood Moon" (1993)

Smallville
 Smallville: "Spell" (2004) - Season 4, Episode 8
 Smallville: "Thirst" (2005) - Season 5, Episode 5

Superboy
 Superboy: "Young Dracula" (1989) - Season 2, Episode 4
 Superboy: "Run, Dracula, Run" (1990) - Season 2, Episode 16
 Superboy: "The Haunting of Andy McAlister" (1990) - Season 2, Episode 22
 Superboy: "Werewolf" (1991) - Season 3, Episode 19
 Superboy: "Hell Breaks Loose" (1991) - Season 4, Episode 9

Supernatural
 Supernatural: "It's the Great Pumpkin, Sam Winchester" (2008) - Season 4, Episode 7
 Supernatural: "Mint Condition" (2018) - Season 14, Episode 4

Tales from the Darkside
 Tales from the Darkside: "Trick or Treat" (1983)
 Tales from the Darkside: "Halloween Candy" (1985)
 Tales from the Darkside: "The Cutty Black Sow" (1988)

Teen Wolf
Teen Wolf: 'Galvanize" (2014) - Season 3, Episode 15
Teen Wolf: "Illuminated" (2014) - Season 3, Episode 16

Touched by an Angel
 Touched by an Angel: "The Occupant" (1999) 
 Touched by an Angel: "The Invitation" (2000)

Unsolved Mysteries
 Unsolved Mysteries: "Episode #3" (1988)
 Unsolved Mysteries: "Episode #207" (1992)

The Vampire Diaries
 The Vampire Diaries: "Haunted" (2009) - Season 1, Episode 7
 The Vampire Diaries: "Masquerade" (2010) - Season 2, Episode 7
 The Vampire Diaries: "Ghost World" (2011) - Season 3, Episode 7
 The Vampire Diaries: "The Five" (2012) - Season 4, Episode 4
 The Vampire Diaries: "Monster's Ball" (2013) - Season 5, Episode 5
 The Vampire Diaries: "The World Has Turned and Left Me Here" (2014) - Season 6, Episode 5
 The Vampire Diaries: "I Carry Your Heart with Me" (2015) - Season 7, Episode 4

Wonder Woman
 Wonder Woman: "The Starships Are Coming" (1979)
 Wonder Woman: "Phantom of the Roller Coaster - Part 1" (1979)
 Wonder Woman: "Phantom of the Roller Coaster - Part 2" (1979)

Teen drama
 90210: "Unmasked" (2009) - Season 2, Episode 7
 Felicity: "Spooked" (1998) - Season 1, Episode 5
 Freaks and Geeks: "Tricks and Treats" (1999) - Season 1, Episode 3
 My So-Called Life: "Halloween" (1994) - Season 1, Episode 9
 On My Block: "Chapter Four" (2018)
 Party of Five: "Personal Demons" (1996)
 Trinkets: "Ghouls Just Wanna Have Fun" (2020)
 Veronica Mars: "President Evil" (2006) - Season 3, Episode 5
 Revenge: "Masquerade" (2013) - Season 2, Episode 18

Freeform 
The TV channel Freeform (dating back to when it was known as Fox Family) annually presented their special "13 Nights of Halloween" with specialized Halloween episodes of regularly scheduled programs, as well as specified Halloween specials and movies to play for the 13 nights leading up to October 31. This was expanded to the entire 31 nights of October in 2018.

Beverly Hills, 90210
 Beverly Hills, 90210: "Halloween" (1991) - Season 2, Episode 13
 Beverly Hills, 90210: "Things That Go Bang in the Night" (1994) - Season 5, Episode 8
 Beverly Hills, 90210: "Gypsies, Cramps, and Fleas" (1995) - Season 6, Episode 8
 Beverly Hills, 90210: "Fearless" (1996) - Season 7, Episode 7

Dawson's Creek
 Dawson's Creek: "The Scare" (1998) - Season 1, Episode 11
 Dawson's Creek: "Escape from Witch Island" (1999) - Season 3, Episode 7
 Dawson's Creek: "Four Scary Stories" (2001) - Season 5, Episode 9
 Dawson's Creek: "Living Dead Girl" (2002) - Season 6, Episode 6

Degrassi: The Next Generation
 Degrassi: The Next Generation: "Degrassi of the Dead" (2007) - Season 3, Episode 5
 Degrassi: The Next Generation: "The Curse of Degrassi" (2008) - Season 4, Episode 7

Gossip Girl
 "The Handmaiden's Tale" (2007) - Season 1, Episode 6
 "How to Succeed in Bassness" (2009) - Season 3, Episode 7

Gossip Girl (2021)
 "Hope Sinks" (2021) - Season 1, Episode 5

One Tree Hill
 "An Attempt to Tip the Scales" (2005) - Season 3, Episode 4
 "Not Afraid" (2010) - Season 8, Episode 6

Pretty Little Liars
 Pretty Little Liars: "The First Secret" (2011) - Season 2, Episode 13
 Pretty Little Liars: "This Is a Dark Ride" (2012) - Season 3, Episode 13
 Pretty Little Liars: "Grave New World" (2013) - Season 4, Episode 13
 Pretty Little Liars: Original Sin: "Chapter Four: The Fe(Male) Gaze" (2022) - Season 1, Episode 4
 Pretty Little Liars: Original Sin: "Chapter Five: The Night He Came Home" (2022) - Season 1, Episode 5

Scream
 Scream: "Pilot" (2015)
 Scream: "The Dance" (2015) - Season 1, Episode 9
 Scream: "Revelations" (2015) - Season 1, Episode 10
 Scream: "Halloween" (2016) - Season 2, Episode 13
 Scream: "Halloween II" (2016)
 Scream: "The Deadfast Club" (2019) - Season 3, Episode 1
 Scream: "The Man Behind the Mask" (2019) - Season 3, Episode 3

Scream Queens
 Scream Queens: "Haunted House" (2015) - Season 1, Episode 4
 Scream Queens: "Pumpkin Patch" (2015) - Season 1, Episode 5
Scream Queens: "Seven Minutes in Hell" (2015) - Season 1, Episode 6
 Scream Queens: "Halloween Blues" (2016) - Season 4, Episode 4

Comedy-drama
 1000 Ways to Die: "Grave Decisions: The Halloween Episode" (2011)
 Ally McBeal: "Girls' Night Out" (2000) - Season 4, Episode 2
 Better Things: "Scary Fun" (2016)
 Black Monday: "Who Are You Supposed to Be?" (2020)
 The Carrie Diaries: "Fright Night" (2013)
 Cupid: "Meat Market" (1998)
 The Days and Nights of Molly Dodd: "Here Are Some Things That Go Bump in the Night" (1990)
 Doogie Howser, M.D.: "Revenge of the Teenage Dead" (1990)
 Flying High: "In the Still of the Night" (1978)
 Franklin & Bash: "Spirits in the Material World" (2014)
 Gilmore Girls: "Twenty-One Is the Loneliest Number" (2005)
 Glee: "The Rocky Horror Glee Show" (2010) - Season 2, Episode 5
Hindsight: "A Very Important Date" (2015)
Kevin Can F**k Himself: "Ghost" (2022)
Las Vegas: "When Life Gives You Lemon Bars" (2007)
Looking: "Looking For Gordon Freeman" (2014)
M*A*S*H: "Trick or Treatment" (1982)
Mr. Corman "Action Adventure" (2021)
Northern Exposure: "Jules et Joel" (1991)
Orange Is The New Black: "Mischief Mischief" (2018) - Season 6, Episode 5
Parenthood (1990 series): "Hollow Halloween" (1990)
Parenthood (2010 series): "Orange Alert" (2010)
Picket Fences: "Remembering Rosemary" (1992)
Pushing Daisies: "Girth" (2007)
Resident Alien: "The Alien Within" (2022)
Scrubs: "My Big Brother" (2002)
Ugly Betty: "The Lyin', the Watch and the Wardrobe" (2006)
Undone: "That Halloween Night" (2019)
WandaVision: "All-New Halloween Spooktacular!" (2021)

Boston Legal
 Season 2, Episode 6: "Witches of Mass Destruction" (2005)
 Season 3, Episode 7: "Trick or Treat" (2006)

Hart of Dixie
 Season 1, Episode 6: "The Undead & the Unsaid" (2011)
 Season 2, Episode 5: "Walkin' After Midnight" (2012)
 Season 3, Episode 4: "Help Me Make It Through the Night" (2013)

Reality shows 
The Anna Nicole Show: "Halloween Party" (2002)
Bethenny Ever After : "Halloween in the Hills"
Cake Boss: "Creepy Crawly Cake and Haunted House" (2017)
 "Creeps, Carvings, and Coffins" (2009)
Chrisley Knows Best: "A Very Grisly Chrisley" 
 "Boos Brothers"
Criss Angel Mindfreak: "Halloween Special" (2006)
Drugs Inc.: "Detroit Halloween" (2015)
Here Comes Honey Boo Boo: "A Very Boo Halloween" (2013)
Here Comes Honey Boo Boo: "Halloween Too" (2014)
Jon & Kate Plus 8: "10 Little Pumpkins" (2007)
Kate Plus 8: "A Haunting at the Gosselins" (2017)
The Little Couple: "Bill's Surgery" (2015)
Little People Big World: "Halloween Harvest Hustle" (2007)
Long Island Medium: "Halloween Spirit" (2012)
Newlyweds: Nick and Jessica: "Jess Gets a Root Canal" (2005)
The Osbournes: "The Show Must Go Oz" (2004)
OutDaughtered: 
 "A Nightmare on Quint Street"
 "Too Scared to Sleep" (2021)
Pawn Stars: "Rick or Treat" (2011)
Sister Wives: "Carving Into Polygamy" (2011)
Shahs of Sunset: "A Nightmare on Destiny Street" (2021)
Southern Charm: "Pulp Friction" (2018)
Teen Mom : 
 "Forgive and Forget"(2016)
 "Surprise, Surprise" (2015)
 "Momster Mash" (2019)
Teen Mom 2: "The Hangover" (2018)

Girls Next Door
The Girls Next Door: "Ghostbusted" (2005)
The Girls Next Door: "Girls Will Be Ghouls" (2006)
The Girls Next Door: "Scream Test" (2008)

The Real Housewives Franchise
 The Real Housewives of Atlanta: 
 "Nightmare on Peachtree Street" (2018)
 "If You Got It, Haunt It" (2021)
The Real Housewives of Beverly Hills: "Meet Rinna Jayne" (2019)
The Real Housewives of Dallas: "Face to Two Face" (2017)
The Real Housewives of New Jersey: 
 "Drop Dead Gorgas" (2011)
 "House of Horrors" (2021)
 Real Housewives of New York City: 
 "Unfashionable Late" (2009)
 "Ghouls Just Wanna Have Fun" (2018)
 "Shark Bait" (2019)
 "Shalloween" (2019)
 "Love Him and Leave Them" (2020)
 "Eat, Drink, and Be Scary" (2020)
 "Stop and Throw the Roses" (2021)
 "Electile Dysfunction" (2021)

Teen and adult sitcoms
 30 Rock: "Stone Mountain" (2009)
 3rd Rock from the Sun: "Scaredy Dick" (1997) - Season 3, Episode 5
 A to Z: "E Is for Ectoplasm" (2014)
 Abbott Elementary: "Candy Zombies" (2022)
 About a Boy: "About a Will-O-Ween" (2014) - Season 2, Episode 3
 Accidental Family: "Halloween's on Us" (1967)
 The Adventures of Ozzie and Harriet: "Halloween Party" (1952) - Season 1, Episode 5
 Awkward: "That Girl Strikes Again" (2013)
 Alexa & Katie: "PB Without J" (2018)
 ALF: "Some Enchanted Evening" (1987) - Season 2, Episode 6
 Aqua Teen Hunger Force: "The Shaving" (2003)
 Baby Daddy: "Strip or Treat" (2014) - Season 4, Episode 1
 Bachelor Father: "The House at Smuggler's Cove" (1961)
 Back in the Game: "Night Games" (2013)
 Barney Miller: "Werewolf" (1976)
 Beavis and Butt-head: "Bungholio: Lord of the Harvest" a.k.a. "Butt-O-Ween" (1995) - Season 6, Episode 1
 Ben and Kate: "Scaredy Kate" (2012)
 Benson: "The Stranger" (1985)
 The Bernie Mac Show: "Night of Terror" (2005) - Season 5, Episode 6
 Bette: "Halloween" (2000)
 Better with You: "Better with Halloween" (2010)
 Black Dynamite (TV series): "'Warriors Come Out' or 'The Mean Queens of Halloween'" (2014)
 Bless This Mess: "Scare Night" (2019)
 Blockbuster: "Evan and Trevin" (2022)
 Blossom: "All Hallows Eve" (1992)
 Bottom: "Terror" (1995)
 The Brady Bunch: "Fright Night" (1972)
 Brotherly Love: "Witchcraft" (1995)
 Brothers: "Masquerade" (1987)
 Caroline in the City: "Caroline and the First Date" (1998) - Season 4, Episode 5
 Charles in Charge: "Trick or Treat" (1984)
 The Charmings: "A Charming Halloween" (1987)
 Chicago Party Aunt: "Halloweener Circle" (2021)
 The Class: "The Class Goes Trick-or-Treating" (2006)
 Corner Gas Animated: "Haunt for Dread October" (2021)
 Cougar Town: "You Don't Know How It Feels" (2010) - Season 2, Episode 6
 Cristela: "Hall-Oates-Ween" (2014)
 Curb Your Enthusiasm: "Trick or Treat" (2001)
 Cuts: "Reverse the Curse" (2005)
 Cybill: "Halloween" (1997)
 Dennis the Menace: "Haunted House" (1961)
 The Dick Van Dyke Show: "The Ghost of A. Chantz" (1964)
 Diff'rent Strokes: "A Haunting We Will Go" (1984)
 Dinosaurs: "Little Boy Boo" (1992)
 Don't Trust the B---- in Apartment 23 : "Love and Monsters..." (2012) - Season 2, Episode 2
 Do Over: "Halloween Kiss" (2002)
 Drexell's Class: "Best Halloween Ever" (1991)
 Eddsworld: "Halloween Special" (2005–07)
 Eddsworld: "Trick or Treat" (2015)
 Empty Nest: "It's Not Easy Being Green" (1992)
 Evening Shade: "Night of the Living Newtons" (1993)
 Everybody Hates Chris: "Everybody Hates Halloween" (2005)
 Everybody Loves Raymond: "Halloween Candy" (1998) - Season 3, Episode 6
 F is for Family: "'F' is for Halloween" (2015)
 Faking It: "Spooking It" (2016)
 The Facts of Life: "The Halloween Show" (1983)
 Freddie: "Halloween" (2005)
 Free Spirit: "Hallowinnie" (1989)
 Friends: "The One with the Halloween Party" (2001) - Season 8, Episode 6
 George & Leo: "The Halloween Show" (1997)
 Glenn Martin, DDS: "Halloween Hangover" (2009)
 Good Morning, Miami: "Kiss of the Spiderman" (2002)
 Grace Under Fire: "The Ghost and Mrs. Kelly" (1996)
 Great News: "Night of the Living Screen" (2017) - Season 2, Episode 5
 The Gregory Hines Show: "Eight and a Half Months" (1997)
 Guys Like Us: "It's the Great Pumpkin, Maestro Harris" (1998)
 Guys With Kids: "Apartment Halloween" (2012)
 Happy Endings: "Spooky Endings" (2011) - Season 2, Episode 5
 Happy Hour: "Boo! This Party Sucks" (2006)
 Hazel: "A-Haunting We Will Go" (1965)
 Home Movies: "Coffins and Cradles" (2003)
 How to Rock: "How to Rock Halloween" (2012)
 I Dream of Jeannie: "My Master, the Ghostbreaker" (1968)
 I'm with Her: "All About Evil" (2003)
 In-Laws: "Halloween: Resurrection" (2002)
 Instant Mom: "Children of the Candy Corn" (2014)
 It's All Relative: "The Doctor Is Out" (2003)
 It's Always Sunny in Philadelphia: "Who Got Dee Pregnant?" (2010) - Season 6, Episode 7
 The Jeff Foxworthy Show: "With Two You Get Cow's Milk" (1995)
 The Jeffersons: "Now You See It, Now You Don't" (1979)
 Jesse: "Boo! He's Back" (1998)
 The John Larroquette Show: "Isosceles Love Triangle" (1996)
 Just Shoot Me!: "Halloween? Halloween!" (2002) - Season 7, Episode 4
 Kate & Allie: "Halloween II" (1986)
 Kevin Can Wait: "Hallow-We-Ain't-Home" (2016) - Season 1, Episode 7
 King of Queens: "Ticker Treat" (2001) - Season 4, Episode 6
 Kirk: "Helloween" (1995)
 Laverne & Shirley: "Ghost Story" (1983)
 The League: "Ghost Monkey" (2010) - Season 2, Episode 7
 Less Than Perfect: "Knock, Knock, Who's Dead?" (2004)
 Louie: "Halloween; Ellie" (2011)
 Love That Girl!: "Trick or Treat" (2011)
 The Lucy Show: "Lucy and the Monsters" (1965)
 Mad About You: "The Unplanned Child" (1993) - Season 2, Episode 6
 Major Dad: "There's No Place Like Farlow" (1992)
 Married: "Halloween" (2014)
 Married People: "Who You Gonna Call?" (1990)
 Marry Me: "Scary Me" (2014)
 Maybe It's Me: "The Halloween Episode" (2001)
 The Mayor: "City Hall-oween" (2017)
 Meego: "Halloween" (1997)
 The Mick: "The Haunted House" (2017) -  Season 2, Episode 4
 Mike & Molly: "Happy Halloween" (2011) - Season 2, Episode 6
 The Millers: "Giving the Bird" (2013) -  Season 1, Episode 5
 The Mindy Project: "Halloween" (2012) -  Season 1, Episode 4
 Minor Adjustments: "Boo!" (1995)
 Mork & Mindy: "A Morkville Horror" (1979)
 Mr. Belvedere: "Halloween" (1986)
 Mr. Rhodes: "The Halloween Show" (1996)
 Mulaney: "Halloween" (2014)
 The Munsters: "Munster Masquerade" (1964)
 My Family: "Friday the 31st" (2003)
 My Name is Earl: "Little Bad Voodoo Brother" (2008) - Season 4, Episode 8
 My Sister Sam: "Who's Afraid of Virginia Schultz?" (1986)
 My Three Sons: "The Ghost Next Door" (1962), "The Cat Burglars" (1970)
 Nanny and the Professor: "Nanny and Her Witch's Brew" (1971)
 Ned & Stacey: "Halloween Story" (1995)
 The Neighborhood: "Welcome to the Haunting" (2021)
 The New Addams Family: "Halloween with the Addams Family" (1998)
 Newhart: "Take Me to Your Loudon" (1987)
 NewsRadio: "Halloween" (1996) - Season 3, Episode 7 
 Norm: "Norm vs. Halloween" (2000) - Season 3, Episode 5
 The Odd Couple: "I Kid, You Not" (2016) - Season 3, Episode 3
 One Day at a Time: "One Halloween at a Time" (2020)
 Out All Night: "Hammer Halloween" (1992)
 Outsourced: "Bolloween" (2010)
 The Parent 'Hood: "The Taxi Man" (1995)
 The Parkers: "Scary Kim" (2000)
 Partners: "Who Are You Supposed to Be?" (1995)
 Perfect Harmony: "Halle-Boo-Yah!" (2019)
 The Real McCoys: "The Ghostbreakers" (1959)
 The Real O'Neals: "The Real Halloween" (2016) - Season 2, Episode 3
 Rel: "Halloween" (2018)
 Reno 911!: "Halloween" (2003) - Season 1, Episode 14
 Resident Advisors: "Halloween" (2015)
 Rhoda: "Ida Works Out" (1977)
 Saved by the Bell: "Mystery Weekend" (1991)
 Schooled: "Run, Rick, Run" (2019) -  Season 2, Episode 6
 Silver Spoons: "A Dark and Stormy Night" (1984)
 The Single Guy: "Love Train" (1996)
 Sister Kate: "Hilary's Date" (1989)
 Sister, Sister: "Halloween" (1995) - Season 3, Episode 7
 Small Wonder: "The Lawsonville Horror" (1987)
 Something So Right: "Something About Schmoozing" (1996)
 Square Pegs: "Halloween XII" (1982)
 Stark Raving Mad: "The Lyin' King" (1999)
 Sunnyside: "Skirt-Skirt" (2019)
 Super Fun Night: "Chick or Treat" (2013)
 Tabitha: "Halloween Show" (1977)
 Tacoma FD: "To Nightmare Manor" (2020) - Season 2, Episode 12
 Teen Angel: "I Love Nitzke" (1997)
 That Girl: "Secret Ballot" (1968)
 Too Something: "Maria Cooks" (1995)
 Trophy Wife: "Halloween" (2013)
 Twins: "Halloween Boo" (2005)
 Two of a Kind: "Nightmare on Carrie's Street" (1998)
 Undateable: "Halloween Walks Into a Bar" (2015) - Season 3, Episode 5
 Unfabulous: "The Dark Side" (2005)
 Unhappily Ever After: "Hair Stalker" (1996)
 Valerie: "Nightmare on Oak Street" (1987)
 The Wayans Bros.: "Scared Straight" (1995)
 Welcome to the Family: "Halloween" (2013)
 Wings: "The Gift of Life" (1996)
 Working: "Armageddon Outta Here" (1998)
 Yes, Dear: "Halloween" (2001) - Season 2, Episode 6
 You Wish: "Halloween" (1997)
 You're The Worst: "Spooky Sunday Funday" (2015) - Season 2, Episode 8
 Young Sheldon: "Seven Deadly Sins and a Small Carl Sagan" (2018) - Season 2, Episode 6

8 Simple Rules
 Season 1, Episode 7: "Trick or Treehouse" (2002)
 Season 3, Episode 6: "Halloween" (2004)

According to Jim
 Season 1, Episode 5: "Unruly Spirits" (2001)
 Season 3, Episode 7: "Dana Dates Jim" (2003)
 Season 4, Episode 5: "Dress to Kill Me" (2004)

The Addams Family
 The Addams Family: "Halloween with the Addams Family" (1964) - Season 1, Episode 7
 The Addams Family: "Halloween, Addams Style" (1965) - Season 2, Episode 7
 Halloween with the New Addams Family (TV movie, 1977)

Alice
 Alice: "Alice's Halloween Surprise" (1981)
 Alice: "Space Sharples" (1984)

American Dad!
 American Dad!: "Best Little Horror House in Langley Falls" (2010) - Season 7, Episode 3
 American Dad!: "Poltergasm" (2013) - Season 10, Episode 2
 American Dad!: "Steve's Franken Out" (2021) - Season 18, Episode 22

American Housewife
 Season 1, Episode 3: "Westport Zombies" (2016)
 Season 2, Episode 5: "Boo-Who?" (2017)
 Season 3, Episode 5: "Trust Me" (2018)
 Season 4, Episode 5: "The Maze" (2019)

The Beverly Hillbillies
 The Beverly Hillbillies: "Trick or Treat" (1962)
 The Beverly Hillbillies: "Ghost of Clampett Castle" (1968)

Bewitched
 Bewitched: "The Witches Are Out" (1964)
 Bewitched: "Trick or Treat" (1965)
 Bewitched: "Twitch or Treat" (1966)
 Bewitched: "The Safe and Sane Halloween" (1967)
 Bewitched: "To Trick or Treat or Not to Trick or Treat" (1969)

The Big Bang Theory
 Season 1, Episode 6: "The Middle Earth Paradigm" (2007)
 Season 5, Episode 7: "The Good Guy Fluctuation" (2011)
 Season 6, Episode 5: "The Holographic Excitation" (2012)
 Season 12, Episode 6: "The Imitation Perturbation" (2018)

Black-ish/Mixed-ish
 Season 1, Episode 6: "The Prank King" (2014)
 Season 2, Episode 6: "Jacked o' Lantern" (2015)
 Season 3, Episode 5: "The Purge" (2016)
 Season 5, Episode 3: "Scarred for Life" (2018)
 Season 6, Episode 6: "Everybody Blames Raymond" (2019)
 Season 1, Episode 6: "Girls Just Want to Have Fun" (2019)

Bless the Harts
 Season 1, Episode 4: "Cremains of the Day" (2019)
 Season 2, Episode 4: "Dead Mall" (2020)

Bob's Burgers
 Season 3, Episode 2: "Full Bars" (2012)
 Season 4, Episode 2: "Fort Night" (2013)
 Season 5, Episode 2: "Tina and the Real Ghost" (2014)
 Season 6, Episode 3: "The Hauntening" (2015)
 Season 7, Episode 3: "Teen-a Witch" (2016)
 Season 8, Episode 3: "The Wolf of Wharf Street" (2017)
 Season 9, Episode 4: "Nightmare on Ocean Avenue Street" (2018)
 Season 10, Episode 4: "Pig Trouble in Little Tina" (2019)
 Season 11, Episode 4: "Heartbreak Hotel-oween" (2020)
 Season 12, Episode 3: "The Pumpkinening" (2021)
 Season 13, Episode 6: "Apple Gore-chard! (But Not Gory)" (2022)

The Boondocks
 Season 2, Episode 4: "Stinkmeaner Strikes Back" (2007)

Boy Meets World / Girl Meets World
 Season 1, Episode 6: "Boys II Mensa" (1993)
 Season 2, Episode 6: "Who's Afraid of Cory Wolf?" (1994)
 Season 5, Episode 5: "The Witches of Pennbrook" (1997)
 Season 1, Episode 11: "Girl Meets World of Terror" (2014)
 Season 2, Episode 18: "Girl Meets World of Terror 2" (2015)
 Season 3: Episode 15:  "Girl Meets World of Terror 3" (2016)

Brooklyn Nine-Nine
 Season 1, Episode 6: "Halloween" (2013)
 Season 2, Episode 4: "Halloween II" (2014)
 Season 3, Episode 5: "Halloween III" (2015)
 Season 4, Episode 5: "Halloween IV" (2016)
 Season 5, Episode 4: "HalloVeen" (2017)

Cheers
 "Fairy Tales Can Come True" (1984)
  "Diane's Nightmare" (1985)
  "House of Horrors with Formal Dining and Used Brick" (1986)
  "Bar Wars V: the Final Judgement" (1991)

The Cleveland Show
 Season 2, Episode 4: "It's the Great Pancake, Cleveland Brown" (2010)
 Season 3, Episode 3: "Nightmare on Grace Street" (2011)
 Season 4, Episode 1: "Escape from Goochland" (2012)

Clueless
 Season 1, Episode 6: "Making Up Is Hard to Do" (1996)
 Season 2, Episode 6: "Trick or Treat" (1997)
 Season 3, Episodes 4 & 5: "Scream, Murray, Scream!"/"Scream Again, Murray, Scream Again!" (1998)

Community
 Season 1, Episode 7: "Introduction to Statistics" (2009)
 Season 2, Episode 6: "Epidemiology" (2010)
 Season 3, Episode 5: "Horror Fiction in Seven Spooky Steps" (2011)
 Season 4, Episode 2: "Paranormal Parentage" (2013)

The Cosby Show
 Season 2, Episode 6: "Halloween" (1985)
 Season 4, Episode 4: "Cliff's Mistake" (1987)

Daria
 Season 4, Episode 4: "Murder, She Snored" (2000)
 Season 4, Episode 10: "Legends of the Mall" (2000)

Dave's World
 Dave's World: "Lobster Envy" (1994)
 Dave's World: "A Very Barry Pumpkin Show" (1996)

Dharma & Greg
 Season 2, Episode 6: "A Closet Full of Hell" (1998)
 Season 3, Episode 6: "The Very Grateful Dead" (1999)
 Season 5, Episode 7: "Used Karma" (2001)

Dr. Ken
 Season 1, Episode 5: "Halloween-Aversary" (2015)
 Season 2, Episode 5: "D.K.'s Korean Ghost Story" (2016)

The Drew Carey Show
 Season 2, Episode 5: "The Devil, You Say" (1996)
 Season 5, Episode 6: "Drew Tries to Kill Mimi" (1999)
 Season 7, Episode 6: "It's Halloween, Dummy" (2001)

Duncanville
 Season 1, Episode 4: "Witch Day" (2020)
 Season 2, Episode 12: "Witch Day 2" (2021)
 Season 3, Episode 12: "Witch Day 3" (2022)

Ellen
 Season 3, Episode 6: "Trick or Treat – Who Cares?" (1995)
 Season 4, Episode 6: "The Bubble Gum Incident" (1996)

Family Guy
 Season 9, Episode 4: "Halloween on Spooner Street" (2010)
 Season 12, Episode 3: "Quagmire's Quagmire" (2013)
 Season 14, Episode 4: "Peternormal Activity" (2015)
 Season 20, Episode 3: "Must Love Dogs" (2021)
 Season 21, Episode 6: "Happy Holo-ween" (2022)

Family Matters
 Season 2, Episode 7: "Dog Day Halloween" (1990)
 Season 4, Episode 6: "Whose Kid Is It Anyway?" (1992)
 Season 5, Episode 6: "Best Friends" (1993)
 Season 6, Episode 6: "Dark and Stormy Night" (1994)
 Season 8, Episode 7: "Stevil" (1996)
 Season 9, Episode 7: "Stevil II: This Time He's Not Alone" (1997)

Frasier
 Season 5, Episode 3: "Halloween" (1997)
 Season 9, Episode 6: "Room Full of Heroes" (2001)
 Season 10, Episode 5: "Tales from the Crypt" (2002)

Fresh Off the Boat
 Season 2, Episode 5: "Miracle on Dead Street" (2015)
 Season 3, Episode 3: "Louisween" (2016)
 Season 4, Episode 4: "It's a Plastic Pumpkin, Louis Huang" (2017)
 Season 5, Episode 3: "Working the 'Ween" (2018)
 Season 6, Episode 5: "Hal-lou-Ween" (2019)

The Fresh Prince of Bel-Air
 Season 1, Episodes 8 & 9: "Someday Your Prince Will Be in Effect" (1990)
 Season 4, Episode 7: "Hex and the Single Guy" (1993)

Full House / Fuller House
 Full House: "It's Not My Job" (1988)
 Full House: "Divorce Court" (1989)
 Fuller House: "Curse of Tanner Manor" (2016)
 Fuller House: "Uncle Jesse's Adventures in Babysitting" (2017)

Ghosts
 Ghosts: "Halloween" (2021)
 Ghosts: "Halloween 2: The Ghost of Hetty's Past" (2022)

George Lopez
 George Lopez: "Halloween Cheer" (2002)
 George Lopez: "No One Gets Out Alive" (2003)
 George Lopez: "Leave It to Lopez" (2004)
 George Lopez: "Trick or Treat Me Right" (2005)

Gilligan's Island
 Gilligan's Island: "Ghost a Go-Go" (1966)
 Gilligan's Island: "Up at Bat" (1966)

Girlfriends
 Girlfriends: "The Remains of the Date" (2000)
 Girlfriends: "Trick or Truth" (2001)

The Goldbergs
 Season 1, Episode 6: "Who Are You Going to Telephone?" (2013)
 Season 2, Episode 5: "Family Takes Care of Beverly" (2014)
 Season 3, Episode 6: "Couples Costume" (2015)
 Season 4, Episode 5: "Stefan King" (2016)
 Season 5, Episode 5: "Jackie Likes Star Trek" (2017)
 Season 6, Episode 5: "Mister Knifey-Hands" (2018)
 Season 7, Episode 6: "A 100% True Ghost Story" (2019)
 Season 9, Episode 6: "The Hunt for the Great Albino Pumpkin" (2021)
 Season 10, Episode 6: "DKNY" (2022)

The Great North
 Season 2, Episode 3: "The Yawn of the Dead Adventure" (2021)
 Season 3, Episode 6: "Blood Actually Adventure" (2022)

Growing Pains
 Growing Pains: "Fool for Love" (1988) 
 Growing Pains: "Happy Halloween" (Parts 1 and 2) (1990)

Hangin' with Mr. Cooper
 Season 2, Episode 6: "Father Fairest" (1993)
 Season 3, Episode 6: "Mo' Money" (1994)
 Season 4, Episode 5: "Halloween" (1995)

Happy Days
 Happy Days: "Haunted" (1974)
 Happy Days: "Fonsillectomy" (1977)
 Happy Days: "The Evil Eye" (1978)

Happy Tree Friends
 Happy Tree Friends: "Boo Do You Think You Are?" (2000)
 Happy Tree Friends: "Out of Sight, Out of Mime" (2002)
 Happy Tree Friends: "Remains to Be Seen" (2003)
 Happy Tree Friends: "Read 'em and Weep" (2007)
 Happy Tree Friends: "Can't Stop Coffin" (2007)
 Happy Tree Friends: "Peas in a Pod" (2008)
 Happy Tree Friends: "Without a Hitch" (2009)
 Happy Tree Friends: "All In Vein" (2012)
 Happy Tree Friends: "A Vicious Cycle" (2013)

Home Economics 

 Season 2, Episode 6: "Box of King-Size Candy Bars, $48.99" (2021)
 Season 3, Episode 6: "Novel Signed by Author, $22.19" (2022)

Home Improvement
 Season 2, Episode 6: "The Haunting of Taylor House" (1992)
 Season 3, Episode 6: "Crazy for You" (1993)
 Season 4, Episode 6: "Borland Ambition" (1994)
 Season 5, Episode 6: "Let Them Eat Cake" (1995)
 Season 6, Episode 7: "I Was a Teenage Taylor" (1996)
 Season 7, Episode 5: "A Night to Dismember" (1997)
 Season 8, Episode 6: "Bewitched" (1998)

The Honeymooners/The Jackie Gleason Show
 The Honeymooners: "Halloween Party" (1953)
 The Honeymooners: "Halloween Party for the Boss" (1954)
 The Honeymooners: "Curse of the Kramdens" (1966)

Hope & Faith
 Hope & Faith: "Hope Has No Faith" (2003)
 Hope & Faith: "Faith Scare-Field" (2004)
 Hope & Faith: "The Halloween Party" (2005)

How I Met Your Mother
 Season 1, Episode 6: "Slutty Pumpkin" (2005)
 Season 6, Episode 7: "Canning Randy" (2010)
 Season 7, Episode 8: "The Slutty Pumpkin Returns" (2011)

The Hughleys
 The Hughleys: "The Curse of the Coyote Man" (1999)
 The Hughleys: "Scary Hughley" (2000)
 The Hughleys: "Whatchoo Stalkin' About, Willis?" (2001)

Inside Job
 Season 2, Episode 6: "Rontagion" (2022)

In the House
 Season 2, Episode 6: "Futile Attraction" (1995)
 Season 3, Episode 8: "The Curse of Hill House" (1996)

The Jamie Foxx Show
The Jamie Foxx Show: "Kiss & Tell" (1996)
The Jamie Foxx Show: "Misery Loves Company" (1997)

The Jersey
 Season 2, Episode 6: "Halloween" (2000)
 Season 3, Episode 5: "Halloween 2: The Legend of Henry" (2002)

King of the Hill
 Season 2, Episode 4: "Hilloween" (1997)
 Season 7, Episode 9: "Pigmalion" (2003)

Last Man Standing
 Season 1, Episode 4: "Last Halloween Standing" (2011)
 Season 3, Episode 5: "Haunted House" (2013)
 Season 4, Episode 5: "School Merger" (2014)
 Season 5, Episode 6: "Halloween" (2015)
 Season 6, Episode 5: "Trick or Treat" (2016)
 Season 7, Episode 4: "Bride of Prankenstein" (2018)

Life with Bonnie
 Life with Bonnie: "A Day in the Life" (2002)
 Life with Bonnie: "The Merry Ole Land of Oz" (2003)

Living Single
 Season 2, Episode 8: "Trick or Trust" (1994)
 Season 4, Episode 7: "I've Got You Under My Skin" (1996)

Malcolm & Eddie
Malcolm & Eddie: "The Boy Who Cried Werewolf" (1996)
Malcolm & Eddie: "Twisted Sisters" (1998)

Malcolm in the Middle
 Season 2, Episode 2: "Halloween Approximately" (2000)
 Season 7, Episode 4: "Halloween" (2005)

Married... with Children
 Season 8, Episode 7: "Take My Wife, Please" (1993)
 Season 10, Episode 7: "Flight of the Bumblebee" (1995)
 Season 11, Episode 20: "Damn Bundys" (1997)

Martin
 Season 1, Episode 10: "The Night He Came Home" (1992)
 Season 5, Episode 5: "Boo's in the House" (1996)

Melissa & Joey
 Melissa & Joey: "A Fright in the Attic" (2010)
 Melissa & Joey: "Witch Came First" (2014)

The Middle
 Season 2, Episode 6: "Halloween" (2010)
 Season 3, Episode 6: "Halloween II" (2011)
 Season 4, Episode 6: "Halloween III: The Driving" (2012)
 Season 5, Episode 5: "Halloween IV: The Ghost Story" (2013)
 Season 6, Episode 5: "Halloween V" (2014)
 Season 7, Episode 6: "Halloween VI: Tick Tock Death" (2015)
 Season 8, Episode 3: "Halloween VII: The Heckoning" (2016)
 Season 9, Episode 4: "Halloween VIII: Orson Murder Mystery" (2017)

Moesha
 Moesha: "Halloween: Part 1: Kim's Revenge" (1997)
 Moesha: "The Nutty Moesha" (2000)

Modern Family
 Season 2, Episode 6: "Halloween" (2010)
 Season 4, Episode 5: "Open House of Horrors" (2012)
 Season 6, Episode 6: "Halloween 3: AwesomeLand" (2014)
 Season 8, Episode 5: "Halloween 4: The Revenge of Rod Skyhook" (2016)
 Season 9, Episode 5: "It's The Great Pumpkin, Phil Dunphy" (2017)
 Season 10, Episode 5: "Good Grief" (2018)
 Season 11, Episode 5: "The Last Halloween" (2019)

The Neighbors
 Season 1, Episode 5: "Halloween-ween" (2012)
 Season 2, Episode 5: "Challoweenukah" (2013)

New Girl
 Season 2, Episode 6: "Halloween" (2012)
 Season 3, Episode 6: "Keaton" (2013)

Night Court
 Season 3, Episode 5: "Halloween, Too" (1985)
 Season 4, Episode 4: "Halloween II: The Return of Leon" (1986)
 Season 5, Episode 5: "Safe" (1987)
 Season 7, Episode 4: "Come Back to the Five and Dime, Stephen King, Stephen King" (1989)
 Season 8, Episode 5: "Death Takes a Halloween" (1990)

The Office (U.S.)
 Season 2, Episode 5: "Halloween" (2005)
 Season 5, Episode 6: "Employee Transfer" (2008)
 Season 7, Episode 6: "Costume Contest" (2010)
 Season 8, Episode 5: "Spooked" (2011)
 Season 9, Episode 5: "Here Comes Treble" (2012)

One on One
 One on One: "Phantom Menace" (2001)
 One on One: "Manic Monday" (2004)
 One on One: "Where's My Yemmy?" (2005)

Parks and Recreation
 Season 2, Episode 7: "Greg Pikitis" (2009)
 Season 4, Episode 5: "Meet 'n' Greet" (2011)
 Season 5, Episode 5: "Halloween Surprise" (2012)
 Season 6, Episode 7: "Recall Vote" (2013)

Perfect Strangers
 Perfect Strangers: "Aliens" (1988)
 Perfect Strangers: "Fright Night" (1991)

Punky Brewster
 Punky Brewster: "The Perils of Punky (Parts 1 and 2)" (1985)
 Punky Brewster: "Love Thy Neighbor" (1985)

Raising Hope
 Season 1, Episode 5: "Happy Halloween" (2010)
 Season 3, Episode 5: "Don't Ask, Don't Tell Me What to Do" (2012)

Reba
 Reba: "The Ghost and Mrs. H" (2003)
 Reba: "Best Lil' Haunted House in Texas" (2005)

Robot Chicken
 "The Robot Chicken Walking Dead Special: Look Who's Walking"
 "Happy Russian Deathdog Dolloween 2 U"

Rodney
 Rodney: "Halloween" (2004)
 Rodney: "Halloween and Javier" (2005)

Roseanne / The Conners
Roseanne
 Season 2, Episode 7: "BOO!" (1989) 
 Season 3, Episode 7: "Trick or Treat" (1990)
 Season 4, Episode 6: "Trick Me Up, Trick Me Down" (1991)
 Season 5, Episode 7: "Halloween IV" (1992)
 Season 6, Episode 6: "Halloween V" (1993)
 Season 7, Episode 6: "Skeleton in the Closet" (1994)
 Season 8, Episode 5: "Halloween: the Final Chapter" (1995)
 Season 9, Episode 7: "Satan, Darling" (1996)

The Conners
 Season 1, Episode 3: "There Won't Be Blood" (2018)
 Season 2, Episode 5: "Nightmare on Lunch Box Street" (2019)
 Season 3, Episode 2: "Halloween and the Election vs. The Pandemic" (2020)
 Season 4, Episode 5: "Peter Pan, The Backup Plan, Adventures in Babysitting, and a River Runs Through It" (2021)
 Season 5, Episode 6: "Book Bans and Guillotine Hands" (2022)

Sabrina the Teenage Witch
 Season 1, Episode 5: "A Halloween Story" (1996)
 Season 2, Episode 7: "A River of Candy Corn Runs Through It" (1997)
 Season 3, Episode 6: "Good Will Haunting" (1998)
 Season 4, Episode 6: "The Phantom Menace" (1999)
 Season 5, Episode 6: "The Halloween Scene" (2000)
 Season 6, Episode 4: "Murder on the Halloween Express" (2001)

The Simpsons

 The Simpsons: "Treehouse of Horror" (1990) - Season 2
 The Simpsons: "Treehouse of Horror II" (1991) - Season 3
 The Simpsons: "Treehouse of Horror III" (1992) - Season 4
 The Simpsons: "Treehouse of Horror IV" (1993) - Season 5
 The Simpsons: "Treehouse of Horror V" (1994) - Season 6
 The Simpsons: "Treehouse of Horror VI" (1995) - Season 7
 The Simpsons: "Treehouse of Horror VII" (1996) - Season 8
 The Simpsons: "Treehouse of Horror VIII" (1997) - Season 9
 The Simpsons: "Treehouse of Horror IX" (1998) - Season 10
 The Simpsons: "Treehouse of Horror X" (1999) - Season 11
 The Simpsons: "Treehouse of Horror XI" (2000) - Season 12
 The Simpsons: "Treehouse of Horror XII" (2001) - Season 13
 The Simpsons: "Treehouse of Horror XIII" (2002) - Season 14
 The Simpsons: "Treehouse of Horror XIV" (2003) - Season 15
 The Simpsons: "Treehouse of Horror XV" (2004) - Season 16
 The Simpsons: "Treehouse of Horror XVI" (2005) - Season 17
 The Simpsons: "Treehouse of Horror XVII" (2006) - Season 18
 The Simpsons: "Treehouse of Horror XVIII" (2007) - Season 19
 The Simpsons: "Treehouse of Horror XIX" (2008) - Season 20
 The Simpsons: "Treehouse of Horror XX" (2009) - Season 21
 The Simpsons: "Treehouse of Horror XXI" (2010) - Season 22
 The Simpsons: "Treehouse of Horror XXII" (2011) - Season 23
 The Simpsons: "Treehouse of Horror XXIII" (2012) - Season 24
 The Simpsons: "Treehouse of Horror XXIV" (2013) - Season 25
 The Simpsons: "Treehouse of Horror XXV" (2014) - Season 26
 The Simpsons: "Halloween of Horror" (2015) - Season 27
 The Simpsons: "Treehouse of Horror XXVI" (2015) - Season 27
 The Simpsons: "Treehouse of Horror XXVII" (2016) - Season 28
 The Simpsons: "Treehouse of Horror XXVIII" (2017) - Season 29
 The Simpsons: "Treehouse of Horror XXIX" (2018) - Season 30
 The Simpsons: "Treehouse of Horror XXX" (2019) - Season 31
 The Simpsons: "Treehouse of Horror XXXI" (2020) - Season 32
 The Simpsons: "Treehouse of Horror XXXII" (2021) - Season 33
 The Simpsons: "Not It" (2022) - Season 34
 The Simpsons: "Treehouse of Horror XXXIII" (2022) - Season 34

Single Parents
 Season 1, Episode 5: "Politician, Freemason, Scientist, Humorist and Diplomat, Ben Franklin" (2018)
 Season 2, Episode 6: "Welcome to Hell, Sickos!" (2019)

South Park
 Season 1, Episode 7: "Pinkeye" (1997)
 Season 2, Episode 15: "Spookyfish" (1998)
 Season 3, Episode 10: "Korn's Groovy Pirate Ghost Mystery" (1999)
 Season 10, Episode 11: "Hell on Earth 2006" (2006)
 Season 16, Episode 12: "A Nightmare on Face Time" (2012)
 Season 17, Episode 4: "Goth Kids 3: Dawn of the Posers" (2013)
 Season 21, Episode 6: "Sons a Witches" (2017)
 Season 22, Episode 5:  "The Scoots" (2018)
 Season 23, Episode 5: "Tegridy Farms Halloween Special" (2019)

Speechless
 Season 1, Episode 5: "H-A-L-- HALLOWEEN" (2016)
 Season 2, Episode 5: "N-I-- NIGHTMARES ON D-I-- DIMEO S-STREET" (2017)
 Season 3, Episode 3: "I-N-- INTO THE W-O-- WOODS" (2018)

Squidbillies
 Squidbillies: "The Tiniest Princess" (2006)
 Squidbillies: "Squash B'Gosh" (2016)

Step by Step
 Season 4, Episode 6: "Something Wild" (1994)
 Season 7, Episode 7: "Dream Lover" (1997)

Suburgatory
 Season 1, Episode 5: "Halloween" (2011)
 Season 2, Episode 2: "The Witch of East Chatswin" (2012)

Suddenly Susan
 Suddenly Susan: " A Funny Thing Happened on the Way to Susan's Party " (1998)
 Suddenly Susan: "Halloween" (1999)

Superstore
 Season 2, Episode 7: "Halloween Theft" (2016)
 Season 3, Episode 5: "Sal's Dead" (2017)
 Season 4, Episode 4: "Costume Competition" (2018)
 Season 5, Episode 6: "Trick-or-Treat" (2019)

That '70s Show
 Season 2, Episode 5: "Halloween" (1999)
 Season 3, Episode 4: "Too Old to Trick or Treat, Too Young to Die" (2000)

Two and a Half Men
 Season 3, Episode 6: "Hi, Mr. Horned One" (2005)
 Season 12, Episode 1: "The Ol' Mexican Spinach" (2014)

Two Guys and a Girl
 Season 2, Episode 6: "Two Guys, a Girl and a Psycho Halloween" (1998)
 Season 3, Episode 6: "Halloween 2: Mind Over Body" (1999)
 Season 4, Episode 4: "Satanic Curses" (2000)

What I Like About You
 Season 3, Episode 7: "Ghost of a Chance" (2004)
 Season 4, Episode 6: "Halloween" (2005)

Will & Grace
 Season 1, Episode 5: "Boo! Humbug" (1998)
 Season 5, Episode 5: "It's the Gay Pumpkin, Charlie Brown" (2002)

Sketch and variety shows
 Carman's Halloween Concert: Trinity Broadcasting Network (Halloween Night 1998)
 Elvira's Halloween Special (1986)
 Hee Haw: "Ray Stevens / Susan Raye" (1975)
 Laugh In: "Episode #73" (1970)
 Mad TV
 The Paul Lynde Halloween Special (1976)
 Saturday Night Live
 "The David S. Pumpkins Halloween Special" (2017)
 The Sonny & Cher Comedy Hour: "Show 51 - Halloween Episode with Jerry Lewis" (1973)
 The Sonny & Cher Show: "Show 17 (Halloween/Election Day Episode)" (1976)
 The State (American TV series)
 "The State's 43rd Annual All-Star Halloween Special" (1995)

British Halloween-themed TV
In the United Kingdom, Halloween has to compete with Bonfire Night, hence it is not as big as an occasion as it is in the United States. British Halloween-themed television programmes were historically few and far between, but have become more frequent in the 21st century as Halloween has grown there.

Children's
 Angelina Ballerina/Angelina Ballerina: The Next Steps:
 "Henry's Halloween" (2002)
 "Angelina's Trick or Treat Feat" (2011)
 The Basil Brush Show:
 "The Stupid Christmas, I Mean Halloween Episode" (2005)
 "Basil's Hunted House" (2006)
 Bear Behaving Badly
 "Unhappy Halloween" (2007) - Series 1, Episode 18
 Blue Peter
 "Halloween Special" (2010-2012)
 Bob the Builder
 "Spooky Tales" (2015)
 Charlie and Lola
 "What Can I Wear for Halloween?" (2007) - Series 3, Episode 18
 ChuckleVision
 "Halloween" (1987) - Series 1, Episode 6 
 Fireman Sam
 "Halloween" (1990) - Series 3, Episode 3
 The Frighteners: Guillaume (1996) - Series 1, Episode 1 
 Ghosts of Motley Hall
 "Party Piece" (1978) - Series 3, Episode 5 
 The Green Balloon Club
 "Halloween" (2008) - Series 1, Episode 21
 Horrible Histories
 "Scary Special" (2012)
 Horrid Henry
 "Tricks and Treats" (2006)
 Jackanory - "Ghoulies, Ghosties and Long Legged Beasties" read by Jon Pertwee (31 October-4 November 1966), "Witch Stories" read by Rosemary Leach (28 October-1 November 1968), "The Worst Witch" also read by Rosemary Leach (30 October-3 November 1978), "The Witch in Our Attic" read by June Whitfield (29 October-2 November 1979), "Mr McFadden's Hallowe'en" by Rumer Godden and read by Hannah Gordon (26-30 October 1981), "Gobbolino, The Witch's Cat" by Ursula Moray Williams and read by Kathryn Posgon (25-29 October 1982) and "When the Night Wind Howls" with Bernard Cribbins, Penelope Wilton and Jonathon Morris (31 October 1984)
 Little Howard's Big Question
 "How Can I Make a Monster?" (2010) - Series 2, Episode 2
 Me Too!
 "Spooky Party" (2005)
 Moondial (1988) - final episode
 My Parents Are Aliens:
 "Halloween" (2001) - Series 3, Episode 9
 "Halloween Tales" (2003) - Series 7, Episode 4 
 The New Worst Witch
 "Trick or Treat" (2003) - Series 1, Episode 5
 Peppa Pig
 "Pumpkin Party" (2015)
 "Pumpkin Competition" (2016)
 The Pinky and Perky Show
 "The Menacing Phantom" (2008)
 Pumpkin Moon (2005)
 Runaround
 "Halloween Special" (1976)
 Scream Street: Trick or Shriek (2016)
 Simon and the Witch
 "The Halloween Party" (1987) - Series 1, Episodes 9/10
 Ted's Top Ten
 "Halloween Scares" (2021)
 Thomas & Friends:
 "Ghost Train"/Percy's Ghostly Trick (1986) - Series 2, Episode 24 
 "Thomas, Percy and the Dragon" (1991) - Series 3, Episode 7
 "Haunted Henry" (1998) - Series 5, Episode 11
 "Stepney Gets Lost" (1998) - Series 5, Episode 13 
 "Toby's Discovery" (1998) - Series 5, Episode 14
 "Duncan Gets Spooked" (1998) - Series 5, Episode 24
 "Scaredy Engines" (2002) - Series 6, Episode 12 
 "Percy and the Haunted Mine" (2002) - Series 6, Episode 13
 "Jack Frost" (2002) - Series 6, Episode 16
 "Bad Day at Castle Loch" (2003) - Series 7, Episode 11
 "Halloween" (2004) - Series 8, Episode 21
 "The Magic Lamp" (2005) - Series 9, Episode 14
 "Duncan and the Old Mine" (2005) - Series 9, Episode 20
 "Bold and Brave" (2005) - Series 9, Episode 21
 "Skarloey the Brave" (2005) - Series 9, Episode 22
 "Flour Power" (2005) - Series 9, Episode 26
 "Skarloey Storms Through" (2008) - Series 11, Episode 21
 "Toby and the Whistling Woods" (2010) - Series 14, Episode 5
 "Percy and the Monster of Brendam" (2012) - Series 16, Episode 4
 "The Phantom Express" (2013) - Series 17, Episode 13
 "Not So Slow Coaches" (2014) - Series 18, Episode 2
 "Flatbeds of Fear" (2014) - Series 18, Episode 3
 "Signals Crossed" (2014) - Series 18, Episode 5
 "Henry Spots Trouble" (2016) - Series 19, Episode 4
 "The Beast of Sodor" (2016) - Series 19, Episode 7
 "Helping Hiro" (2016) - Series 19, Episode 12
 "Wild Water Rescue" (2016) - Series 19, Episode 26
 "Blown Away" (2016) - Series 20, Episode 9
 "Henry in the Dark" (2017) - Series 20, Episode 21
 "Three Steam Engines Gruff" (2017) - Series 20, Episode 22
 "Cranky at the End of the Line" (2017) - Series 21, Episode 8
 Thomas and Friends: Big World! Big Adventures!:
 "An Engine of Many Colours/Colors" (2018) - Series 22, Episode 9
 "Outback Thomas" (2018) - Series 22, Episode 10
 "Samson and the Fireworks" (2018) - Series 22, Episode 16
 "Cyclone Thomas" (2018) - Series 22, Episode 19
 "Thomas and the Dragon" (2018) - Series 22, Episode 21
 "Diesel Glows Away" (2019) - Series 23, Episode 15
 Timmy Time: Timmy Gets Spooked (2010) - Series 2, Episode 3 
 Tiswas: Halloween Special (1981) - Series 8, Episode 9
 The Worst Witch (1986)
 Worst Witch: A Mean Halloween (1998) - Series 1, Episode 4 
 Worzel Gummidge:
 "Fire Drill" (1980)
 "The Jumbly Sale" (1981)
 Willo the Wisp
 "Halloween" (1981) - Series 1, Episode 20
 Young Dracula
 "Halloween" (2006) - Series 1, Episode 12

Documentaries
 Andy Hamilton: "Search for Satan" (2011)
 Frankenstein - A Modern Myth (2012)
 Great British Ghosts: "Halloween Special" (2011-2012)
 Living Britain: "Halloween" - Series 1, Episode 5 (2009)
 Most Haunted Live!: "Halloween Special" (2002-2010)
 The Perfect Scary Movie (2005)

Drama
 Casualty@Holby City (2005)
 Dead Set (2008)
 Ghostwatch (1992)
 I May Destroy You: "Social Media Is a Great Way to Communicate" (2020)
 Jonathan Creek: "Danse Macabre" (1998) - Series 2, Episode 1
 Juliet Bravo: "Halloween" (1984) - Series 5, Episode 9
 Lewis: "Falling Darkness" (2010) - Series 4, Episode 4
 Lost Hearts (1973) - the M. R. James adaptation was shown at Christmas but set at Halloween (which the original story was not)
 Midsomer Murders: "The Straw Woman" (2003) - Series 7, Episode 6
 Midsomer Murders: "The House in the Woods" (2005) - Series 9, Episode 1
 Midsomer Murders: "Death and the Divas" (2012) - Series 15, Episode 3
 Poirot: "Halloween Party" (2010) - Series 12, Episode 3
 Tales of the Unexpected: "Death in the Morning" (1982) - shown on 31 October and clearly designed for it, though there is only a brief general mention of "October"

Reality
 999: What's Your Emergency?: "Halloween" - Series 1, Episode 5 (2012)
 Bizarre ER: "Halloween" - Series 4, Episode 4 (2011)
 Central Steam: "Halloween" - Series 1, Episode 4 (2010)
 Come Dine with Me: "Halloween Special" - Series 26, Episode 25 (2012)
 Edwardian Farm: "Halloween" - Series 1, Episode 2 (2010)
 The Harbour: "Halloween" - Series 1, Episode 1 (2012)
Killer Camp (2019)
 Live 'n' Deadly: "Halloween" - Series 1, Episode 8 (2010)
 The Only Way is Essex (2011)
 Strictly Come Dancing (2010–present)
 X Factor (2010) (2011) (2012) (2014) (2016)

Shows
 Celebrity Juice - "Halloween Special", Series 8 Episode 10 (2012)
 Choccywoccydoodah - "I put a spell on you", Series 1 Episode 3 (2011)
 Countryfile -  "Halloween" (2009)
 Deal or No Deal -  "Halloween Special" (2011) (2012)
 The Gadget Show - "Halloween Special", Series 12 Episode 13 (2009)
 The Home of Fabulous Cakes - "Halloween Party Recipes", Series 1 Episode 5 (2012)
 Oliver's Twist - "Jamie Oliver's Halloween", Series 1 Episode 25 (2002)
 Paul Daniels - "Live At Halloween" (1987)
 QI - "Death (Halloween Special)", Series D Episode 5 (2006)
 QI - "Horrible (Halloween Special)", Series H Episode 7 (2010)
 River Cottage Forever - "Hugh Fearnley-Whittingstall's Halloween", Series 3 Episode 8 (2002)
 Top of the Pops - "TOTP2 Does Halloween" (2007)

Teen and adult sitcoms
 2point4 Children - "The Lady Vanishes", Series 6 Episode 2 (1996)
 Birds of a Feather - "Ghost", Series 9 Episode 1 (1998)
 Bottom - "Terror", Series 3 Episode 2 (1995)
 Gary: Tank Commander -  "Spooky Dooky", Series 3, Episode 5 (2012)
 The Green Green Grass - "The Departed", Series 4 Episode 6 (2009)
 Home To Roost - "High Spirits",  Series 3 Episode 5 (1987)
 The IT Crowd - "The Haunting of Bill Crouse", Series 1 Episode 5 (2006)
 The League Of Gentlemen - "Yule Never Leave!", Series 2, Episode 7 (2000)
 London Irish - "Halloween Party", Series 1, Episode 3 (2013)
 My Family - "Friday the 31st", Series 4 Episode 8 (2003)
 Not Going Out - "Halloween" (2019)
 The New Tales Of Para Handy - "Halloween", Series 4 Episode 2 (2007)
 Off the Hook - "Halloween", Series 1 Episode 5 (2009)
 One Foot in the Grave - "The Wisdom of the Witch", Series 5 Episode 7 (1995)
 Psychoville - "Halloween Special", Series 1 Episode 8 (2010)
 Sykes - "A Haunting", Series 2 Episode 14 (1973)
 Rising Damp - "Things that go Bump in the Night", Series 2 Episode 7 (1975)
 Only Fools and Horses - "Ashes to Ashes", Series 2 Episode 2 (1982)
 Only Fools and Horses - "Sickness and Wealth", Series 6 Episode 5 (1989)
 Steptoe and Son - "Seance in a Wet Rag and Bone Yard", Series 8 Episode 6 (1974)
 Motherland - "The Purge", Series 2 Episode 4 (2019)

Others

All Saints (Australian medical drama)
 All Saints: "Happy Death Day" (1998)

America's Funniest Home Videos
 America's Funniest Home Videos
 "Halloween Time at Disneyland Park" (2012)

The Canterville Ghost
The Canterville Ghost, based on the novel The Canterville Ghost, is a 1986 made-for-television film starring John Gielgud and Alyssa Milano.

The Halloween Tree
In 1993, Hanna-Barbera produced a made-for-television animated adaptation of Ray Bradbury's classic novel of the same name. Featuring narration by the author himself, the movie explains some of the history of the holiday as experienced via an across-time adventure with a group of trick-or-treating kids. The hand-painted backgrounds, haunting music of John Debney, and Bradbury's narration elevate this to much more than a mere children's Halloween special.

Kapuso Mo, Jessica Soho
The Filipino news magazine program on GMA Network titled Kapuso Mo, Jessica Soho (KMJS) aired a series of Halloween specials (titled "Gabi ng Lagim" since 2013.) since 2008.

Magandang Gabi... Bayan
The Filipino news magazine program on ABS-CBN titled Magandang Gabi... Bayan (hosted by Noli de Castro) aired a series of Halloween specials from 1988 until 2005.

The Midnight Hour
The Midnight Hour (also known as In the Midnight Hour) is a 1985 comedy/horror television movie which aired on ABC on Friday, November 1, 1985, at 9:00-11:00 PM EST and stars Shari Belafonte-Harper, LeVar Burton, Peter DeLuise, and Dedee Pfeiffer.

Neighbours
Neighbours vs Zombies (2014) was an online special split into five parts featuring some of Ramsay Street's well known faces returning from the dead as zombies.

Once Upon a Midnight Scary

This 1979 television anthology Halloween special was hosted by Vincent Price. It featured the stories "The Ghost Belonged To Me," "The Legend of Sleepy Hollow," and "The House With a Clock In Its Walls."

The Price Is Right
Starting in Season 36 (2007), when Drew Carey began hosting the show, each season of the popular US game show has featured a full Halloween episode, with the host, announcer, models, set, and Showcases decorated for this holiday.

Deal or no Deal UK

In 2013 the British game show hosted a week long Halloween themed week of episodes with every contestant dressed up.

The Wickedest Witch (1989)
This made-for-television film aired on NBC on October 30, 1989.

AMC Halloween movie specials
AMC broadcasts many Halloween classics, including the Halloween series, Friday the 13th, Nightmare on Elm Street, and An American Werewolf in London, during the month of October.

See also

 List of films set around Halloween
 List of Christmas television specials
 List of St. Patrick's Day television specials
 List of Thanksgiving television specials
 List of Easter television specials
 List of Valentine's Day television specials

References

External links
 List of Halloween TV Specials, TV Episodes, TV Movies, and Short Films at the Internet Movie Database

 
Lists of television episodes by holiday
Lists of television specials